= OverDrive Media Console =

Media player developed by OverDrive, Inc

- Developer: OverDrive, Inc.
- Final release: v3.2 (Microsoft Windows), v1.1 (Mac OS), v2.6 (iOS, Android, v2.4 BlackBerry), v1.1 (Microsoft Windows 8) / October 2012
- Operating system: Windows XP, Windows Vista, Windows 7, Windows 8, Windows RT, Mac OS X 10.4.9, iOS 4, Android 2.1, BlackBerry 4.5
- Platform: Cross-platform
- Successor: Libby
- Type: Media player
- License: Proprietary software
- Website: app.overdrive.com/overdrivemediaconsole (defunct)

OverDrive Media Console was a proprietary, freeware application developed by OverDrive, Inc. for use with its digital distribution services for libraries, schools, and retailers. The application enables users to access audiobooks, eBooks, periodicals, and videos borrowed from libraries and schools—or purchased from booksellers—on devices running Android, BlackBerry, iOS (iPad/iPhone/iPod), and Windows, including Mac and Windows desktop and laptop computers.

OverDrive Media Console stopped mobile support in May 2023. OverDrive launched the Libby App as an replacement for OverDrive Media Console.

In October 2012, Barnes & Noble added the OverDrive Media Console app to the NOOK App Store, enabling Nook Color, Nook Tablet, and later Nook HD, Nook HD+ and Samsung Galaxy Tab 4 7.0 Nook users to download audiobooks, eBooks, and videos directly to their devices. The OverDrive app was also available for users of the Kindle Fire in the Amazon Apps Store. Also in October 2012, OverDrive released OverDrive Media Console for Windows 8, which supports devices running Microsoft's Windows 8 and Windows RT operating systems.

OverDrive Media Console supports a variety of formats, including EPUB and PDF for reading, and MP3 and Windows Media Audio (WMA) for listening. WMA content is only supported on the Windows version of the OverDrive Media Console, which dramatically reduces the number of titles available on other operating systems. However, many publishers allow transfers of WMA format materials to Apple devices after downloading to a Windows computer.

== See also ==
- 3M#Products and patents (3M Cloud Library)
- Baker & Taylor#Offerings (Axis360)
- Digital audio players
- Windows Media Player
