= Nook (disambiguation) =

Barnes & Noble Nook is a brand of electronic book readers developed by Barnes & Noble, including the application for third party devices.

Nook may also refer to:

== eReader ==
- Barnes & Noble Nook 1st Edition (2009), a first generation E ink electronic book reader
- Nook Color (2010), a first generation LCD electronic book reader/Tablet
- Nook Simple Touch (2011), a second generation E ink electronic book reader
- Nook Tablet (2011), Barnes & Noble's second generation LCD electronic book reader/Tablet
- Nook HD (2012), Barnes & Noble's third generation LCD electronic book reader/Tablet
- Nook HD+ (2012), Barnes & Noble's third generation LCD electronic book reader/Tablet
- Samsung Galaxy Tab 4 Nook 7.0", Barnes & Noble's fourth generation LCD electronic book reader/Tablet
- Samsung Galaxy Tab 4 Nook 10.1", Barnes & Noble's fourth generation LCD electronic book reader/Tablet
- Samsung Galaxy Tab S2 Nook, Barnes & Noble's fifth generation LCD electronic book reader/Tablet

== Places ==
- Nook, Pennsylvania, United States
- Nook, Tasmania, Australia
- Acres Nook, a suburb of Kidsgrove in the Borough of Newcastle-under-Lyme, England
- Daisy Nook, a country park in the town of Failsworth, in the Metropolitan Borough of Oldham, Greater Manchester, England
- Donna Nook, a bombing range on the coast of Lincolnshire, England
- Salendine Nook, a district of Huddersfield in the English county of West Yorkshire
- Teddy's Nook, a house built by Henry Pease at Saltburn-by-the-Sea, Yorkshire, England
- Urlay Nook, a village within the borough of Stockton-on-Tees and the ceremonial county of County Durham, England
- Wall Nook, a small village in County Durham, England

== People ==
- Nook Logan (born 1979), American baseball player

== Arts, entertainment, and media ==
- Nook (album), 1992 second album by German band The Notwist
- "Nook", a Season 2 episode of the science-fiction TV series Lexx
- Tom Nook, fictional shopkeeper in Nintendo's Animal Crossing series
- Book nook, small diorama divider between books

== Other uses ==
- Nook (Latin noca), an obsolete land measure equal to a quarter of a virgate

== See also ==
- The Nook (disambiguation)
- Nanook (disambiguation)
- Nuk (disambiguation), including several places in Iran and other meanings
- Nuuk, capital and largest city of Greenland, Kingdom of Denmark
