= CloudLibrary =

Cloud-based e-book lending platform

cloudLibrary
- Developer: Bibliotheca
- Operating system: iOS, Android
- Platform: Mobile app, web
- License: Proprietary
- Website: www.oclc.org/en/cloudlibrary.html

CloudLibrary (stylized as "cloudLibrary") is a cloud-based software system through which libraries lend electronic books; it is also the name of the app that users download to access the e-books.

CloudLibrary was created in 2011 by 3M as part of its library systems unit as a competitor to OverDrive, Inc.; in 2015 3M sold the North American part of that unit to Bibliotheca Group GmbH, a company founded in 2011 that was funded by One Equity Partners Capital Advisors, a division of JP Morgan Chase.

By 2019, Bibliotecha had tried, unsuccessfully, to negotiate with Amazon to add Kindle-ebook compatibility to cloudLibrary - something that, as of then, Amazon had only made available to Overdrive. In that year, cloudLibrary, along with hoopla offered by Midwest Tape, ODILO, and Baker & Taylor’s Axis 360, were the main competitors to the Overdrive and Libby apps offered by OverDrive, Inc. in the library e-book market.

In April 2024, Bibliotheca sold cloudLibrary to the nonprofit cooperative OCLC. By that time, cloudLibrary was used by around 500 libraries in around 20 countries in around 50 languages, and was used to lend audiobooks, digital magazines, newspapers, and comics, and streaming media, along with e-books.
