= List of filename extensions (S–Z) =

This alphabetical list of filename extensions contains extensions of notable file formats used by multiple notable applications or services.

== S ==
Ext.	Description	Used by
S	Assembler source code file	Unix
S3M	Scream Tracker Module	Scream Tracker
S7I	Seed7 library / include file	Seed7 interpreter and compiler
SAIF	Spatial Archive and Interchange Format	
SASS	Sass stylesheet language, indented-format	
SAT	ACIS ACIS .sat	
SAV	SPSS tabular data (binary)	PSPP, SPSS
SB	Scratch 1.x project	Scratch
SB2	Scratch 2.0 project	Scratch
SB3	Scratch 3.0 project	Scratch
SBH	Header	ScriptBasic
SBV	Superbase RDBMS form definition data	Superbase (database)
SBX	For experimental extensions to Scratch	scratchX
SCALA	Scala source code file	Scala (programming language)
SCM	Scheme source code file	
SCOREBOARD	Virtual machine performance file	VMware
SCR	Screen Protector file	Windows Screen Protector
SCRATCH	Scratch beta (0.x) series project	Scratch
SCSS	Sass stylesheet language	
SDF	SQL Server Compact database file	Microsoft SQL Server Compact
SD7	Seed7 source file	Seed7 interpreter and compiler
SDNN	Encrypted Story Distiller Nursery Notes Database	Story Distiller, Series Distiller
SDS	Self Defining Structure provides for N-dimensional very large datasets using HHCode	geographic information systems and relational database management systems
SDTS	Spatial Data Transfer Standard	
SEC	Secret key ring file	Pretty Good Privacy RSA System
SED	Self extraction directive file	IExpress
SEQ	Video	Tiertex video sequence
SERIES	Encrypted Series Distiller database	Series Distiller
SF	JAR Digital Signature	
SFB	Configuration file	emacs
SFH	backup file for Strike Force Heroes (SFH) on Steam	
SFX	SFX (self-extracting archives) script	RAR
SH	Unix shell script	Unix shell interpreter
SHAR	Shell self-extracting archive	UNSHAR (Unix)
SHTM	SSI-enabled HTM file	Server Side Includes
SHTML	SSI-enabled HTML file	Server Side Includes
SHX	Shape entities	AutoCAD
SHX	assembler source code file	ESRI shapefile, ArcGIS
SIC	S.I.C.K. Source File	
SIG	Signature file	gpg, PopMail, ThunderByte AntiVirus
SJR	ScratchJr project file	ScratchJr
SL	S-Lang source code file	
SLDASM	SolidWorks assembly	SolidWorks
SLDDRW	SolidWorks drawing	SolidWorks
SLDPRT	SolidWorks part	SolidWorks
SM	SMALLTALK source code file	
SMCLVL	Secret Maryo Chronicles Level	Secret Maryo Chronicles
SMD	Plain-text files that contains models of 3D model data, skeletal structures, and animations inside a .mdl	Source engine games
SMK	Smacker video Format (RAD Video)	
SNO	SNOBOL4 source code file	
SO	shared object, dynamically linked library	Unix, Linux
SPF	data	SQR Portable Format
SPIFF	Still Picture Interchange File Format	
SPRITE	Renamed .zip file containing a bundle of data and assets; Contains a .json named sprite.json that holds code and metadata for a Scratch 1.x sprite.	Scratch
SPRITE2	Renamed .zip file containing a bundle of data and assets; Contains a .json named sprite.json that holds code and metadata for a Scratch 2.x sprite.	Scratch
SPRITE3	Renamed .zip file containing a bundle of data and assets; Contains a .json named sprite.json that holds code and metadata for a Scratch 3.x sprite.	Scratch
SPIN	Spin source file	Parallax Propeller Microcontrollers
SPS	SPSS program file (text)	PSPP, SPSS
SPT	SPITBOL source code file	
SPV	SPIR-V binary file	Vulkan, Khronos Group
SPX	Ogg Speex bitstream	Xiph.Org Foundation
SPZ	Crestron SIMPL Windows compiled program (ZIP format)	Crestron SIMPL Windows
SQL	Structured Query Language	Any SQL database
SRT	SubRip Subtitle file	Most media players
SRX	Series Distiller update XML file	Series Distiller
SSC	Celestia Solar System Catalog file	Celestia
SSC	Stellarium Script	Stellarium
ST	SMALLTALK source code file	Little Smalltalk
ST	Structured text file	
STC	Celestia Star Catalog file	Celestia
STC	OpenOffice.org XML spreadsheet template	OpenOffice.org Calc
STD	OpenOffice.org XML drawing template	OpenOffice.org Draw
STEP	Standard for the Exchange of Product Data	universal format for CAD exchange per ISO 10303
STI	OpenOffice.org XML presentation template	OpenOffice.org Impress
STK	Stockholm multiple sequence alignment	Bioinformatics tools eg HMMER, Xrate, Jalview
STL	surface geometry of a three-dimensional object	software by 3D Systems
STM	SSI-enabled HTML file	Server Side Includes
STO	Stockholm multiple sequence alignment	Bioinformatics tools eg HMMER, Xrate, Jalview
STORY	Encrypted Story Distiller database	Story Distiller
STP	Standard for the Exchange of Product Data	universal format for CAD exchange per ISO 10303
STW	OpenOffice.org XML text document template	OpenOffice.org Writer
STX	Story Distiller update XML	Story Distiller
STYL	Stylus style sheet file	Stylus
SUR	Surface topography (in native "SURF" format)	MountainsMap
SVC	Represents the ServiceHost instance hosted by Internet Information Services	Windows Communication Foundation
SVELTE	Svelte source code	Svelte
SVG	Scalable Vector Graphics	
SWF	Shockwave Flash	Macromedia, Adobe Flash Player
SWG	SWIG source code	SWIG
SWIFT	Swift source code	Swift (programming language)
SWM	split Windows Imaging Format	ImageX, DISM, 7-Zip, wimlib
SXC	OpenOffice.org XML spreadsheet	OpenOffice.org Calc
SXD	OpenOffice.org XML drawing	OpenOffice.org Draw
SXG	OpenOffice.org XML master document	
SXI	OpenOffice.org XML presentation	OpenOffice.org Impress
SXM	OpenOffice.org XML formula	OpenOffice.org Calc
SXP	3DS Process file	3D Studio
SXW	OpenOffice.org XML text document	OpenOffice.org Writer
SYLK	Symbolic Link (SYLK) file	Windows
SYMBOLICLINK	Replace file for a symbolic link	Unix-like OSs

== T ==
Ext.	Description	Used by
TAK	Audio codec, Lossless audio file format	Winamp (+Plugin), foobar2000 (+Plugin), Media Player Classic – BE
TAR	tar archive	tar and other file archivers with support
TAZ	tar archive compressed with compress	tar and other file archivers with support
TB2	tar archive compressed with Bzip2	tar and other file archivers with support
TBZ	tar archive compressed with Bzip2	tar and other file archivers with support
TBZ2	tar archive compressed with Bzip2	tar and other file archivers with support
TC	Theme Colour file	Saturn CMS
TER	Terragen heightmap file	Terragen scenery generator
TGA	Truevision Advanced Raster Graphics Adapter image	
TGT	Target configuration file	Target active security software
TGZ	tar archive compressed with gzip	tar and other file archivers with support
THM	Thumbnail File	GoPro, Android, some versions of iOS (Accessible via computer or Jailbreak, on User/Media/PhotoData/Metadata/DCIM)
TIF	See TIFF	
TIFF	Tag Image File Format image	
TJA	Taiko no Tatsujin Custom Songs File	TaikoPlusEX
TLB	Type library	A binary file with information about a COM or DCOM object so other applications can use it at runtime. Created by Visual C++ or Visual Studio. Used by many Windows applications.
TLZ	tar archive compressed with LZMA	tar and other file archivers with support
TMP	Temporary file	
TORRENT	Torrent file	BitTorrent clients (various)
TQL	The quest lessons	TheQuest
TS	MPEG transport stream	Video broadcasting, digital video cameras
TS	TypeScript	
TSCN	Godot Engine Text Scene file	Godot Engine
TSV	Tab-separated values	
TTC	TrueType Font collection	
TTF	TrueType Font file	
TWB	Tableau Software Workbook file	
TXT	Text file	
TXZ	tar archive compressed with xz	tar and other file archivers with support
TZ2	Same as TBZ	tar and other file archivers with support
TZST	tar archive compressed with Zstandard	tar and other file archivers with support

== U ==
Ext.	Description	Used by
UI	Espire source code file	Geoworks UI Compiler Geos
UI	Qt Designer's UI File	Trolltech Qt Designer
UMP	Umple UML Programming Language Format	Umple
UNV	Text file containing finite elements nodal coordinates and more, see notes	Originally used by SDRC for its I-deas software; a lot of simulation software uses it today
UNX	Game code for GameMaker games	GameMaker
UOS	Uniform Office Format spreadsheet	
UOT	Uniform Office Format text	
UPD	Update file for Storage	
UPS	ROM patch file	
URL	Remote file shortcut	Microsoft Windows
USDZ	Augmented Reality (AR) File	Apple, Pixar
UST	Vocal synthesis track data	UTAU
USTX	Vocal synthesis track data	OpenUtau
UT!	datafile	uTorrent
UXF	UML Exchange Format	

== V ==
Ext.	Description	Used by
V	Rocq source file	
V	Verilog source file	
V	V (Vlang) language source	
V3	Victoria 3 save game file	Victoria 3
V4P	vvvv patch	vvvv
V64	ROM image from an N64 cartridge	DoctorV64, Doctor V64 junior, Project 64 and other N64 emulators
VB	Visual Basic .Net source file	Visual Basic .NET
VBOX	virtual machine settings file (in XML format)	VirtualBox
VBOX-EXTPACK	VirtualBox extension package	VirtualBox
VBPROJ	Visual Basic .Net project file	Visual Basic .Net Express and Visual Studio 2003-2010 Project
VBR	Visual Basic Custom Control file	Visual Basic
VBS	VBScript script file	VBScript
VBX	Visual Basic eXtension	Visual Basic
VC	VeraCrypt Disk Encrypted file	Open Source VeraCrypt
VC6	Graphite – 2D and 3D drafting	Ashlar-Vellum
VCLS	VocaListener voice scanner file	VocaListener Plug-in (Vocaloid3)
VDA	Targa bitmap graphics	many raster graphics editors
VDI	Virtual Disk Image	VirtualBox
VDW	Visio web drawing	Microsoft Visio
VDX	Visio XML drawing	Microsoft Visio
VFD	Virtual Floppy Disk	Windows Virtual PC (among others)
VI	Virtual Instrument	LabVIEW
VMCZ	Hyper-V Exported Virtual Machine	Microsoft
VMDK	Virtual Disk file	VMware
VMG	Nokia message file format	Text Message Editor (Nokia PC Suite)
VOB	Video Object	DVD-R, DVD-RW
VMT	Text file that defines a .vtf file	Source engine games
VMX	Virtual machine configuration file	VMware
VPK	Valve package	Source engine games
VPM	Garmin Voice Processing Module	
VPP	Visual Paradigm Project	Visual Paradigm for UML
VPR	Vocal synthesizer track data	Vocaloid 5
VQM	Hardware description language	Altera
VRB	LateX Beamer file containing verbatim commands	LaTeX Beamer
VRB	Veeam reversed incremental backup archive	Veeam software
VS	Vellum Solids	Ashlar-Vellum
VSD	Visio drawing	Microsoft Visio
VSDX	Visio drawing	Microsoft Visio
VSH	V (Vlang) language source	
VSIX	Visual Studio VSIX Package	Visual Studio, Visual Studio Code
VSM	Visual Simulation Model	VisSim
VSQ	Vocal synthesizer track data	Vocaloid 2
VSQx	Vocal synthesizer track data	Vocaloid 3, Vocaloid 4
VST	Truevision Vista graphics	many raster graphics editors
VSTO	Microsoft Office add-in file	Microsoft Visual Studio
VSVNBAK	VisualSVN Server repository backup	VisualSVN Server
VTF	Valve Texture Format file	Valve Corporation
VTX}	3D Anim8or model	Anim8or
VUE	Visual Understanding Environment map	Visual Understanding Environment
VVVVVV	VVVVVV map file	VVVVVV

== W ==
Ext.	Description	Used by
W	Source files for the WEB programming system by Donald Knuth.	Implementations of the WEB system, such as CWEB by Donald Knuth and Silvio Levy.
WAB	Global address book in versions of Microsoft Windows and shared by Microsoft apps such as Outlook and Outlook Express	Outlook and Outlook Express
WAD	Default package format for Doom that contains sprites, levels, and game data	Doom and Doom II
WAD	Package containing Wii Channel data, such as Virtual Console games. It is commonly used in homebrew to install custom channels, and can be installed with a WAD Manager	Nintendo Wii
WAV	Sound format (Microsoft Windows RIFF WAVE)	Media Player
WEBM	Royalty-free video/audio container	HTML5
WIN	Game code for GameMaker games	GameMaker
WHEEL	JSON-formatted file for storing wheel names and images	Wheel of Names
WITNESS_CAMPAIGN	Game save file for The Witness	The Witness
WK1	Spreadsheet	Lotus 1-2-3 version 2.x – Lotus Symphony 1.1+
WK3	Spreadsheet	Lotus 1-2-3 version 3.x
WKS	Spreadsheet	Lotus 1-2-3 version 1A – Lotus Symphony 1.0, Microsoft Works
WL	Wolfram Language package	
WLMP	Windows Live Moviemaker Project, contains paths from where the images/audios/videos of the project are located	Windows Live Movie Maker
WLS	Wolfram Script	Wolfram Language
WMA	Windows Media Audio file Advanced Systems Format	
WMDB	Windows Media Player database	Windows Media Player
WMF	Windows MetaFile vector graphics	
WMV	Windows Media Video file Advanced Systems Format	
WOFF	WOFF	
WOFF2	See WOFF	
WOS	WoS bibliographic reference file	ISI/Clarivate Analytics
WPS	Wii U plugin for aroma	Aroma Environnement (Wii U)
WPX	Wordle pixel art	Pixele
WS	Whitespace programming language, WonderSwan ROM	Whitespace programming language, WonderSwan ROM
WSC	WonderSwan Color ROM	
WTX	Text document	Microsoft Windows 7; IBM Transformation Extender
WUHB	Wii U Homebrew Bundle	Aroma environnement (Wii U)

== X ==
Ext.	Description	Used by
X	LEX source code file	
X	XBasic Source code file	Xbasic
X3D	x3d and xdart Formats	
XAR	Xara graphics file	Files created by Xara Photo & Graphic Designer (formerly Xara Xtreme and Xara Studio); early versions used the extension ART
XAR	eXtensible ARchive	xar, 7-Zip
XBRL	eXtensible Business Reporting Language instance file	eXtensible Business Reporting Language
XCF	Gimp image file	GNU Image Manipulation Program
XDELTA	Binary files diff	Xdelta3, deltapatcher
XDM	Directory Manipulator for 32-bit Protected Mode	Xenotech Research Labs
XE	Xenon – for Associative 3D Modeling	Ashlar-Vellum
XEX	Xbox 360 Executable File	
XLR	Microsoft Works spreadsheet or chart file, very similar to Microsoft Excel's XLS	Microsoft Works
XLS	Microsoft Excel Spreadsheet	Microsoft Excel
XLSB	Microsoft Excel 2007 Binary Workbook (BIFF12)(Spreadsheets)	Microsoft Excel 2007 (see Microsoft Office 2007 file extensions)
XLSM	Microsoft Excel 2007 Macro-Enabled Workbook (Spreadsheets)	Microsoft Excel 2007 (see Microsoft Office 2007 file extensions)
XLSX	Office Open XML Workbook (Spreadsheets)	Microsoft Excel 2007 (see Microsoft Office 2007 file extensions)
XM	FastTracker 2 extended module	AWAVE, Mod4Win, FastTracker, ImpulseTracker
XML	eXtensible Markup Language file	
XMF	eXtensible Music Format	
XP	eXtended Pattern	FastTracker 2
XPL	X-Plane system file	Laminar Research
XPS	Open XML Paper Specification / OpenXPS	Open standard document format initially created by Microsoft and similar in concept to Adobe PDF files
XSD	XML schema description	
XSF	data	Microsoft InfoPath file
XSL	XSL Stylesheet	
XSLT	XSLT file	
XSN	Microsoft InfoPath template	Microsoft InfoPath
XSPF	XML Sharable Playlist Format	
XX	XX-encoded file (ASCII)	XXDECODE
XXE	XX-encoded file (ASCII)	XXDECODE
XXX	Singer Embroidery Format	Embroidermodder
XYZ	Molecular coordinates	XMol, RasMol
XZ	a lossless data compression file format incorporating the LZMA/LZMA2 compression algorithms.	xz

== Y ==
Ext.	Description	Used by
Y	YACC grammar file	Yacc/Bison
YAML	YAML source file	YAML (data serialization language)
YML	YAML source file	YAML (data serialization language)
YML	YML markup file	domain specific language output to XML
YYMP	GameMaker Extension File	GameMaker
YYMPS	GameMaker Extension File	GameMaker
YYP	GameMaker Project File	GameMaker
YYZ	GameMaker Project Export File	GameMaker

== Z ==
Ext.	Description	Used by
ZIG	Zig language source	
ZIP	ZIP (file format)	PKZip – WinZip – Mac OS X
ZRX	REXX scripting language for ZOC_(software)	ZOC terminal emulator
ZS	Script for Minecraft mod MineTweaker and CraftTweaker	Minecraft Mods
ZST	ZStandard, a lossless data compression file format.	zstd

== See also ==
- List of filename extensions
- List of file formats
