= Content Reserve =

American digital e-warehouse, launched 2000

- Launch date: 2000
- Platform(s): Windows 98, Windows 2000, Windows XP, Windows Vista
- Website: www.contentreserve.com (defunct)

Content Reserve is a digital e-warehouse operated by OverDrive, Inc. It holds more than 150,000 eBook, audiobook, music, and video titles. Content Reserve serves as a digital repository for publishers to distribute downloadable media through OverDrive's retail and library channels. It is also the collection development portal for libraries using OverDrive Digital Library Reserve. As of April 2008, more than 7,500 libraries and retailers and 500 publishers utilize Content Reserve.

Content Reserve provides hosting, storage, management, and protection services for digital content in WMA, WMV, PDF, EPUB, PRC, and LIT formats. Audio and video content fulfilled from Content Reserve through an OverDrive channel is played in the proprietary OverDrive Media Console software, while the various eBook formats can be read in their respective readers (Adobe Reader, Adobe Digital Editions, Mobipocket Reader, and Microsoft Reader).

In the summer of 2008, OverDrive began offering management and fulfillment services for audio content in the MP3 format.

== Publishing market ==
Content Reserve provides DRM-protection and download audiobook, eBook, music, and video distribution services through OverDrive's channels. Through Content Reserve, publishers can upload content, set user permissions, establish pricing, monitor sales activity, and edit content marketing metadata. Publishers only need to add each piece of content one time, and can then distribute this content to members OverDrive's network of libraries, schools, and retailers. Some publishers with content available in Content Reserve are Random House, Harlequin, Hachette Book Group, HarperCollins, BBC Audio Books America, and Brilliance Audio.

== Library market ==
Content Reserve is the collection development portal for libraries using the download service Digital Library Reserve. Public library collection managers can review title metadata such as jacket covers and descriptions, and order audiobooks, eBooks, music, and video for their digital collection. Purchased titles are automatically added to their library's online collection.

Content Reserve also features collection development tools such as a Download Standing Order Plan, which works like a print book standing order plan, and a Holds Manager, which automatically adds titles to a library's collection when a waitlist reaches the library-supplied holds ratio., Using Content Reserve, librarians can also upload digital materials for which they own the copyright or have permission from the content owner (for instance, a book written by a local author) to make them available for circulation at their patron-facing Digital Library Reserve website. Some major libraries utilizing OverDrive's services include New York Public Library, Boston Public Library, Singapore National Library, and Toronto Public Library.

== Online retail market ==
Content Reserve supplies online stores with digital audiobook and eBook content. Retailers select which eBooks and audiobooks are included in their inventory and then distribute them via their current online store or one developed using OverDrive's MIDAS service. Content Reserve retailers receive alerts about new titles and new publishers offering their eBooks and audiobooks. Major retailers utilizing Content Reserve include Borders, eFollett.com, Harlequin, and WH Smith.

== See also ==
- OverDrive, Inc.
- OverDrive Media Console
