= The Internet Bookshop =

British online bookseller

- Type: Private limited company
- Industry: Bookselling
- Founded: 1992
- Founder: Darryl Mattocks
- Defunct: 2008
- Headquarters: Oxford, United Kingdom
- Products: Books

The Internet Bookshop was a British online bookseller based in Oxford, started in 1994 by Darryl Mattocks.

== History ==
The company was incorporated as a private limited company in October 1992 with founding director Darryl Mattocks. Originally called Vision Assist Limited, it provided information technology consultancy services before beginning to sell books online from the www.bookshop.co.uk website in 1994, using personal funding and a loan from the Blackwell family (who own Blackwell UK).

In February 1997, the company was transferred to a new holding company called bookshop.co.uk PLC which was floated on the OFEX market, raising £1 million. For the year 1997, turnover was £2.1 million, up from £0.6 million the year before, and a loss of £0.4 million was recorded. The total number of books available was 1.4 million.

Owing to the timing of its launch as an online bookseller, comparisons were made at the time between the company and Amazon.com. In BBC’s The Money Programme, Mattocks explained that copyright restrictions prevented the UK-based company from selling cheaper US editions of the same books in the UK market, while US rivals did not face the same barrier to entry.

In June 1998, the company was sold for £9.4 million to WHSmith as the retailer expanded its online operations. The original website address is now redirected to the main WHSmith page.

The Internet Bookshop (Oxford) Limited was dissolved in February 2008, almost a decade after the online bookselling business had been sold to WHSmith.
