= XWP =

XWP may stand for:

- Xena: Warrior Princess, an American television series filmed in New Zealand
- XWP, a filename extension for Crosstalk
- XWP, a filename extension for Xerox Writer
