= Basil Blackwell =

English bookseller (1889–1984)

Sir Basil Henry Blackwell (29 May 1889 – 9 April 1984) was an English bookseller.

== Biography ==
Blackwell was born in Oxford, England. He was the son of Benjamin Henry Blackwell (1849–1924), founder of Blackwell's bookshop in Oxford, which went on to become the Blackwell family's publishing and bookshop empire, located on Broad Street in central Oxford. The publishing arm is now part of Wiley-Blackwell.

He was educated at Magdalen College School, Oxford and Merton College, Oxford. He was the first person in his family to attend university. In 1913, he began working with his father at Blackwell's. Upon his father's death in 1924, he took over the company and remained working there for decades. He married Marion Christine Soans in 1914. Their daughter was Dame Penelope Jessel.

He was made a Knight Bachelor in 1956 by Queen Elizabeth II, the only bookseller ever to receive that honour. In 1959, he was elected to an honorary Fellowship at Merton. In 1970, he was given the honorary Freedom of the City of Oxford.

In 1979, he was awarded a Doctorate of Civil Law honoris causa at the Oxford Encaenia.

Blackwell was a prosecution witness in the 1966 private prosecution attempt to bar the book Last Exit to Brooklyn from UK publication.

== Family ==
His sons and their sons took the business further, either through the bookselling or publishing arms:

- Julian “Toby” Blackwell (bookselling)
  - Philip Blackwell
- Richard Blackwell (publishing)
  - Miles Blackwell (–2001)
