= Blackwell's =

British academic book retailer and library supply service

Blackwell UK
- Type: Subsidiary
- Industry: Retail; Bookselling; Wholesale
- Founded: 1879; 147 years ago
- Founder: Benjamin Henry Blackwell
- Headquarters: Oxford, England, UK
- Number of locations: 18 shops (2022)
- Area served: UK
- Products: Books, Maps
- Revenue: ▲£58.27 million (2019)
- Number of employees: 1,000 (in 2011)
- Parent: Waterstones
- Website: www.Blackwells.co.uk

Blackwell UK, also known as Blackwell's and Blackwell Group, is a British academic book retailer and library supply service owned by Waterstones. It was founded in 1879 by Benjamin Henry Blackwell, after whom the chain is named, on Broad Street, Oxford. The brand now has a chain of 9 shops, and an accounts and library supply service. It employs around 1000 staff in its divisions.

The Broad Street branches, which included speciality music and art/poster shops, remained the only ones until expansion in the early 1990s, when at peak after taking over Heffers in Cambridge in 1999 and James Thin in Scotland in 2002, the company had more than 70 outlets. Its library supply chain serves an international market, but parts were sold off in 2009, with the North American arm of Blackwell Book Services and the Australian business James Bennett sold to Baker & Taylor for their academic arm YBP Library Services. The group were also publishers, under the Blackwell publishing imprint, which published more than 800 journals when it was sold to John Wiley & Sons in 2007 for £572 million to form Wiley-Blackwell.

The Blackwell family ran the company until 2022, with an ownership divided between voting shares owned by the family and wealth shares owned by family and others. There was a public dispute in 2002 between Julian "Toby" Blackwell, the current owner of the group, and Nigel Blackwell, the former chairman of the publishing arm, about the possible sale of the publishing business. This led to an offer of £300 million from Taylor & Francis and to an eventual deal with John Wiley & Son in 2006, as a result of which Nigel Blackwell and Toby's son Philip Blackwell left the business, leaving Toby Blackwell the sole family member still involved in running the company. Other family voting shares were held by a trust, which Toby's shares would transfer on his death, eventually bringing an end to the Blackwell family involvement with the company. Toby Blackwell announced in 2009 that the wealth shares would be distributed between staff, transforming the company into an employee-partnership, similar to that of retailer John Lewis, when the company returned to profitability having spent several years experiencing losses. The company reported it was expecting to return to profit in 2012.

In February 2022, the UK book chain Waterstones, itself under the umbrella of Elliott Management Corporation, bought Blackwell's.

== History ==
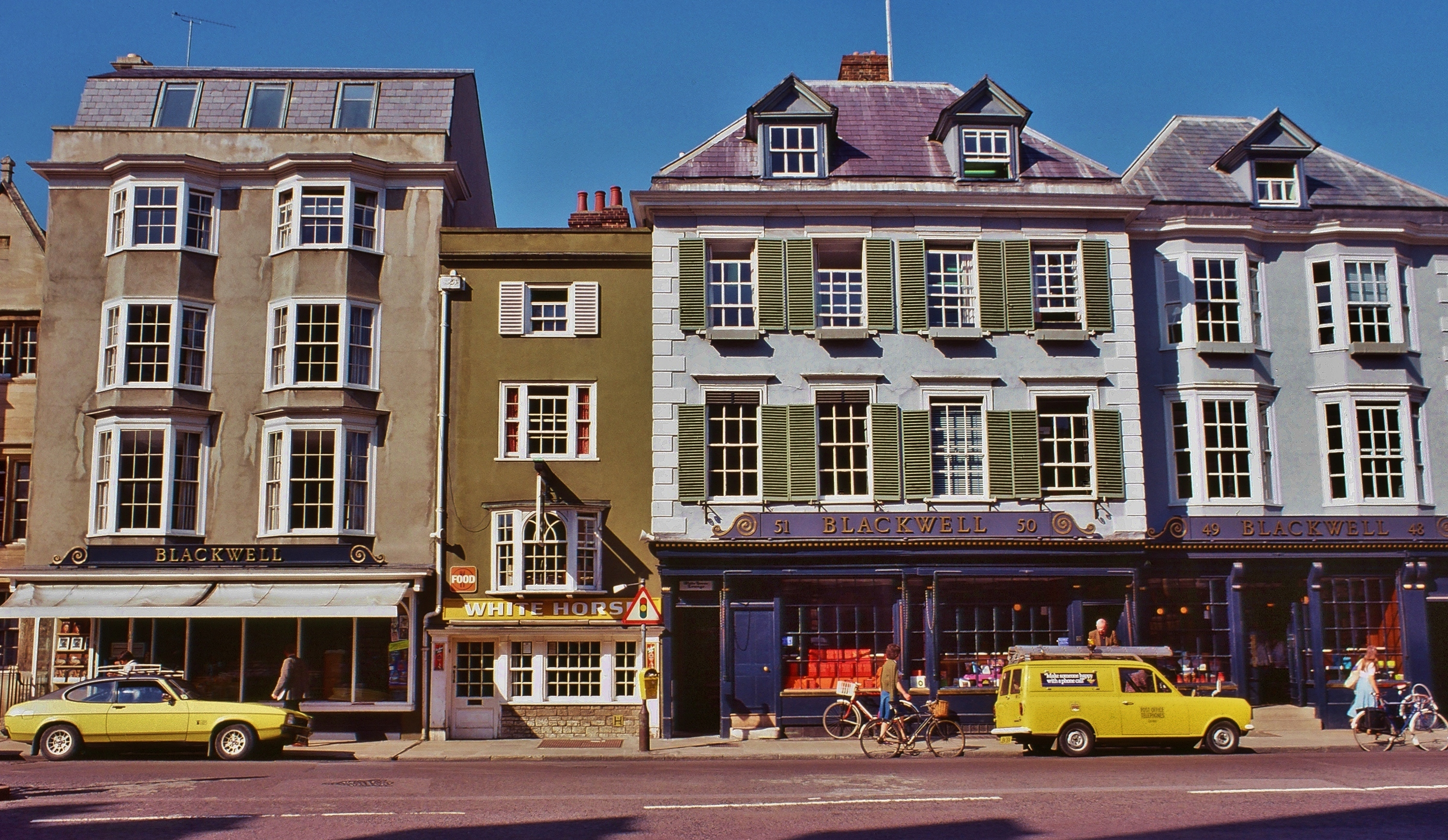
The main shop in Oxford in 1977

The company was founded in 1879 by Benjamin Henry Blackwell, son of the first city librarian, who having finished his education at 13, was apprenticed to a local bookseller for a shilling a week. His father, Benjamin Harris Blackwell, had been heavily involved in the Temperance Society. The society promoted, as well as religion, self-education and also encouraged reading. The society provided separate rooms for non-alcoholic refreshment and silent reading. A religious family, the Blackwells had also become involved with the Temperance Society due to Benjamin's father being teetotal, and as a protest against the government making money from the excise duty on alcohol.

The flagship shop at 48–51 Broad Street, Oxford, was originally only twelve feet square but quickly grew to incorporate the upstairs, cellar and neighbouring shops. Benjamin Henry Blackwell was well respected in Oxford and was elected the first Liberal councillor for Oxford North.

Basil Blackwell, Benjamin Henry's son, became the first Blackwell to go to university; he was awarded a scholarship at Oxford University's Merton College. He was expected to join the family firm, however, which he did in 1913, after a spell as an apprentice publisher in London. He was tasked with expanding his father's publishing business.

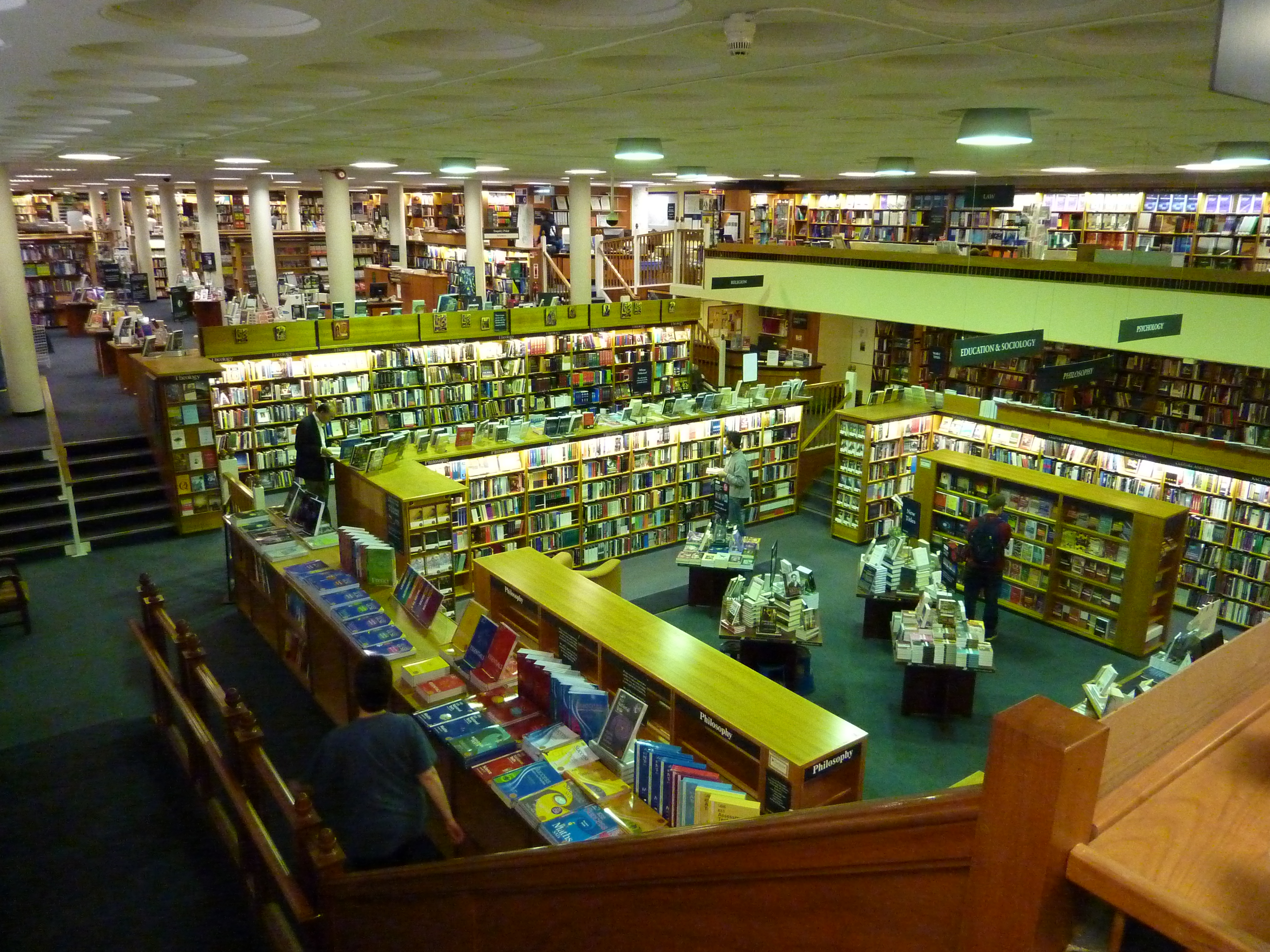
The "Norrington Room", contains more than 160,000 books on 3+ miles of shelving

The first Blackwell publication, Mensæ Secundæ: verses written in Balliol College by Henry Beeching, was printed in 1897. Blackwell's began the careers of many writers: J. R. R. Tolkien's first poem, "Goblin Feet", was published in 1915. To promote universal access to literature, Blackwell's pioneered a series of cheaper books, from a one-volume Shakespeare to "3-and-6 novels". The publishing company was merged into the main company in 1921, and a scientific section was added in 1939.

When Benjamin Henry died in 1924, Basil Blackwell took over from his father, and went on to head the company for decades. Basil Blackwell wanted to preserve fine printing. After rescuing the Shakespeare Head Press, he commissioned belles-lettres, including well-known classics such as the Pilgrim's Progress, the works of the Brontës and a complete version of Chaucer's Canterbury Tales.

In 1966, the Norrington Room was opened, named after Sir Arthur Norrington, the President of Trinity College and extending under part of Trinity College. It boasts three miles (5 km) of shelving and at 10,000 square feet (930 m^{2}) merited an entry in the Guinness Book of Records as the largest single room selling books.

=== Recent history ===
The company has followed a determined policy since the 1990s to spread out from its established Oxford base and take on a much broader UK presence.

In 1995, Blackwell's became the first bookshop in the UK to allow its customers to purchase online from a catalogue of over 150,000 titles, and opened a flagship shop in London the same year, at 100 Charing Cross Road, which was one of the company's six most prominent shops until it closed in 2014 to move to High Holborn. This new store has also since closed. Blackwell's took over the Heffers bookshops in Cambridge in 1999, and in 2002 acquired the academic bookshops of James Thin in Scotland.

Both the Oxford and London flagship shops have won Bookseller of the Year at the British Book Awards.

On 29 October 2012, Blackwell's was – with Foyles, John Lewis department stores, Waitrose, Sainsbury's and Argos – among the retailers to launch the Nook e-reader – and, from November, the Nook HD and Nook HD+ tablet computers.

The company remained in the hands of the Blackwell family until February 2022 when it was acquired by Waterstones.

=== Gallery ===
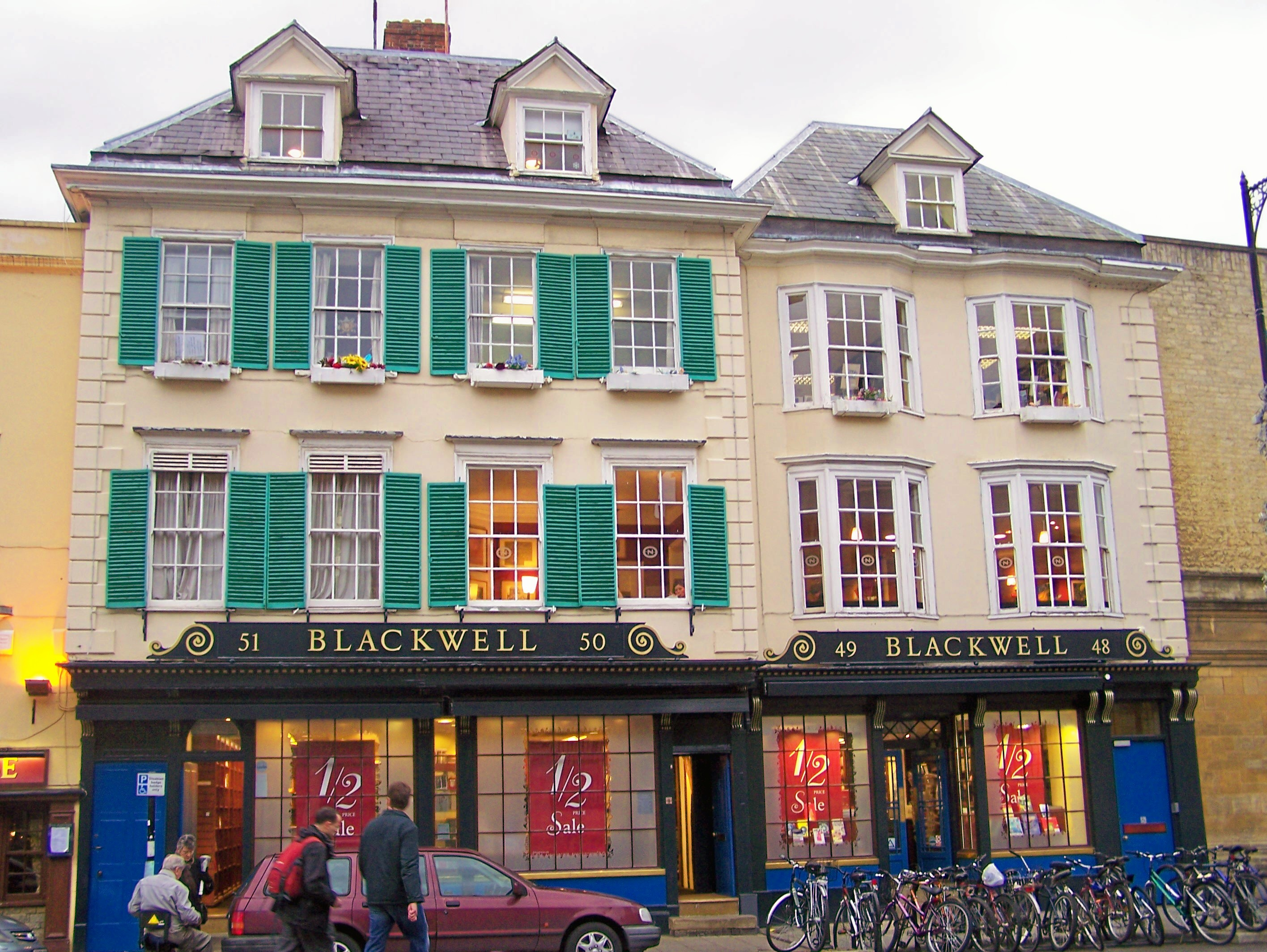
Flagship branch, 48–51 Broad Street, Oxford

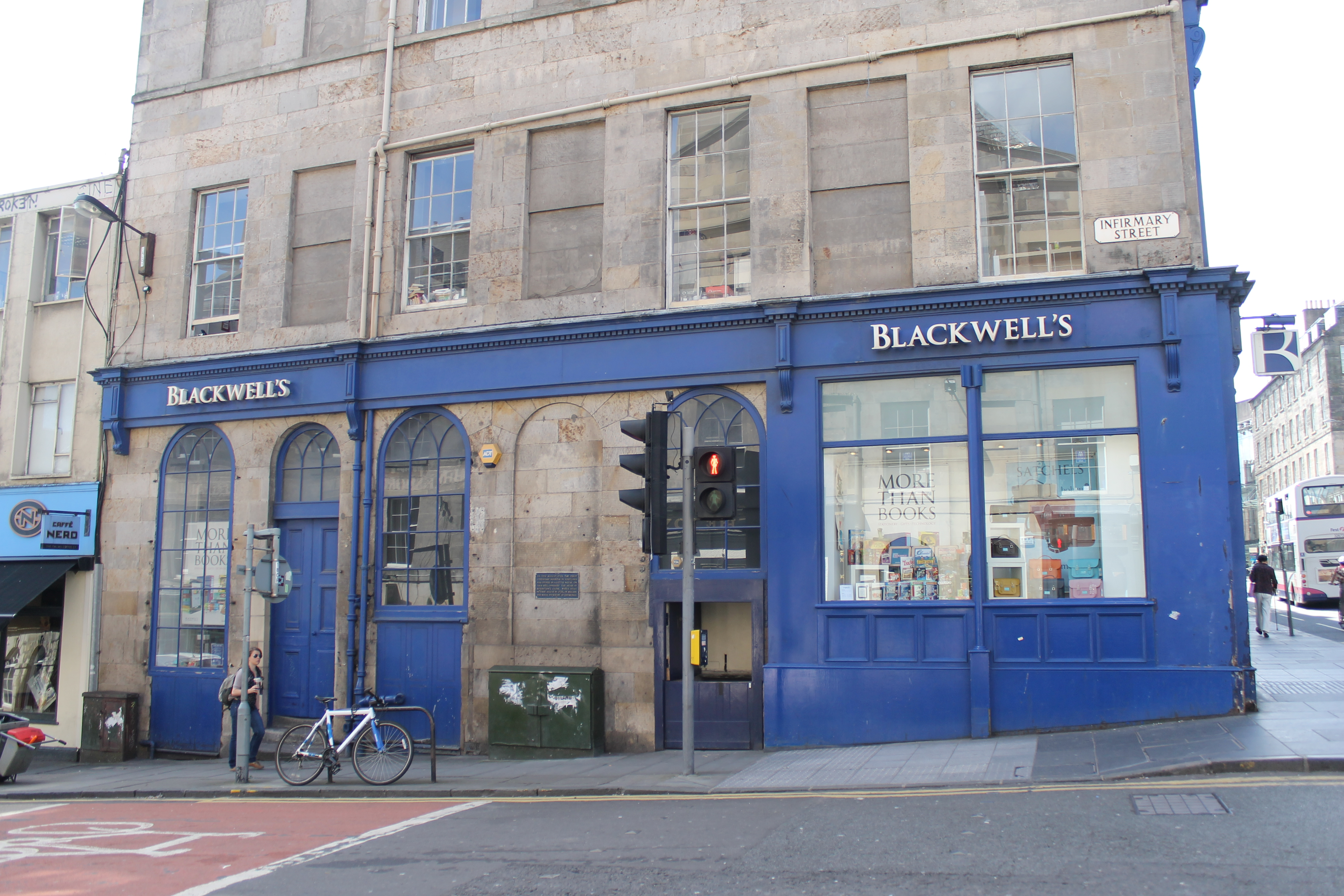
South Bridge, Edinburgh, formerly James Thin

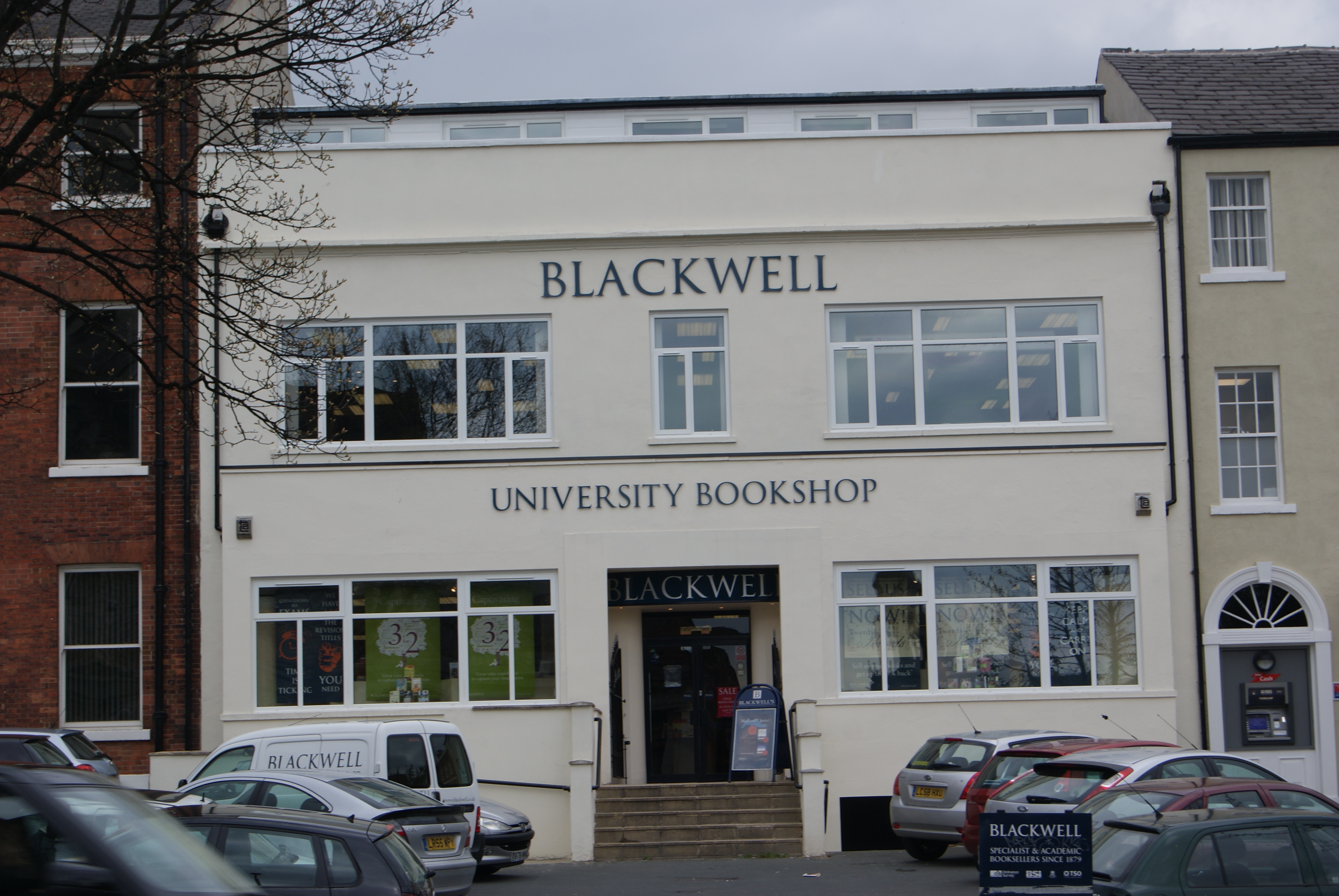
Woodhouse Lane, Leeds

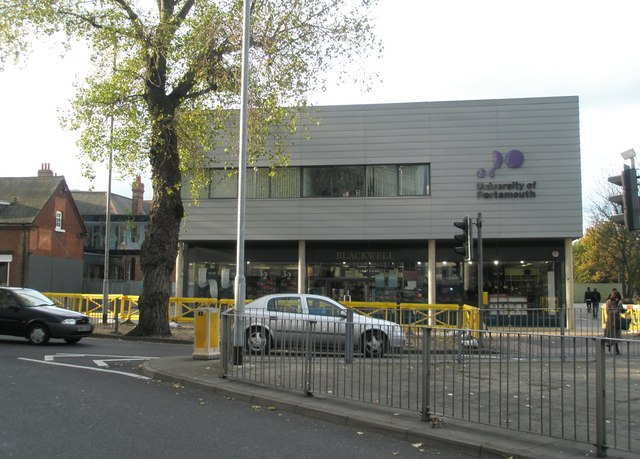
Cambridge Road, University of Portsmouth

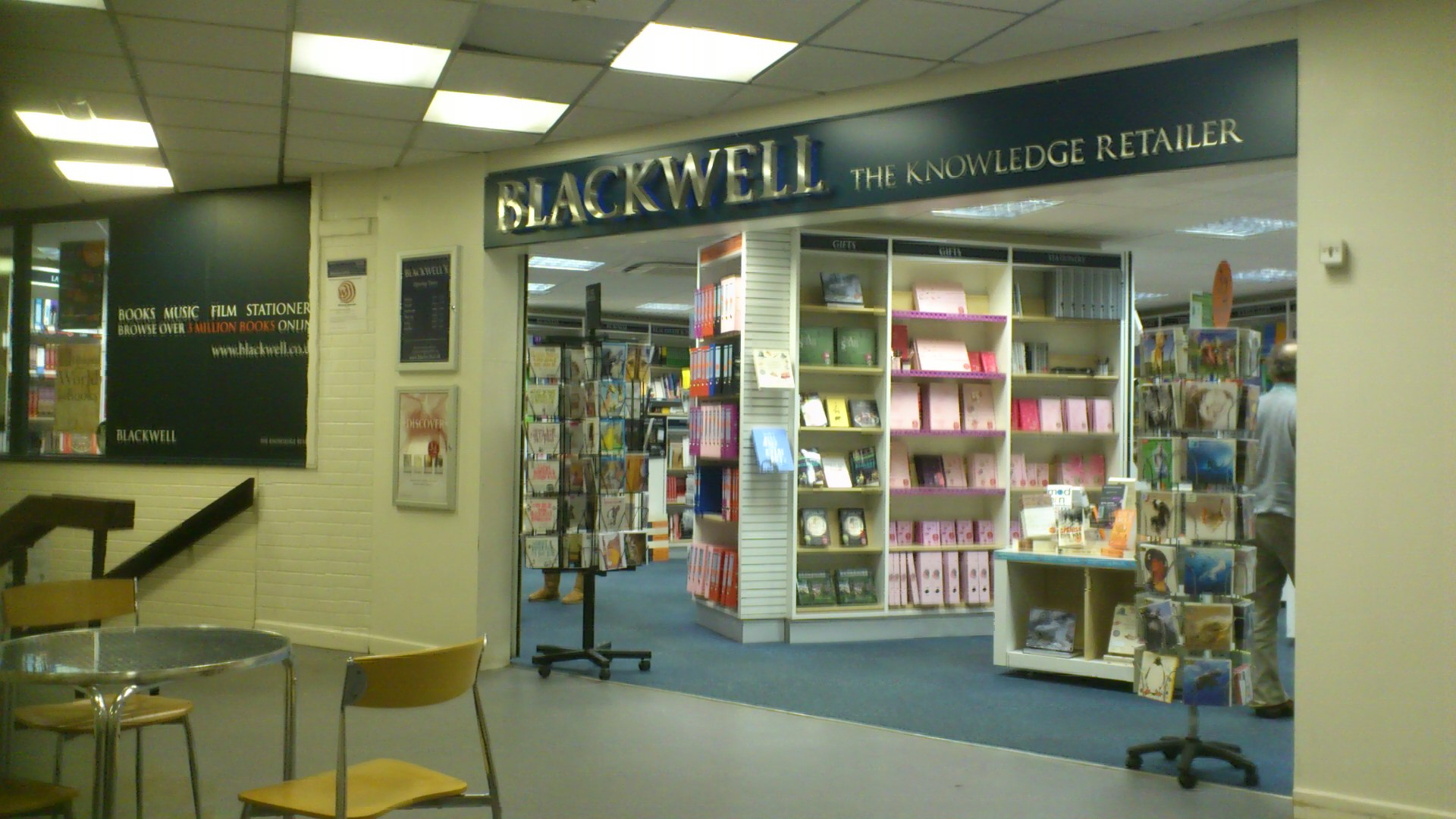
Whiteknights, University of Reading

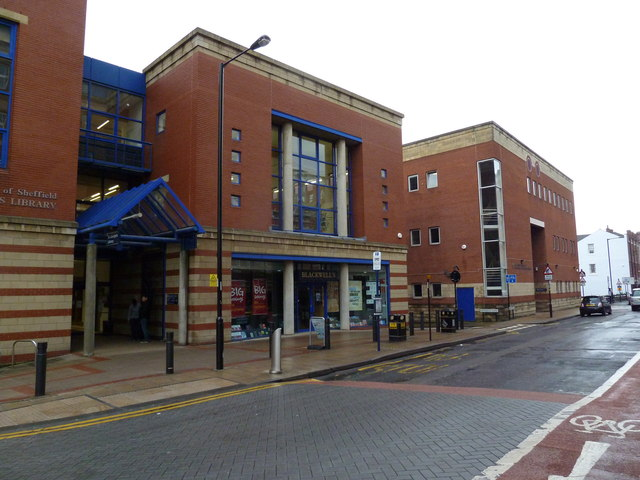
Portobello Street, University of Sheffield

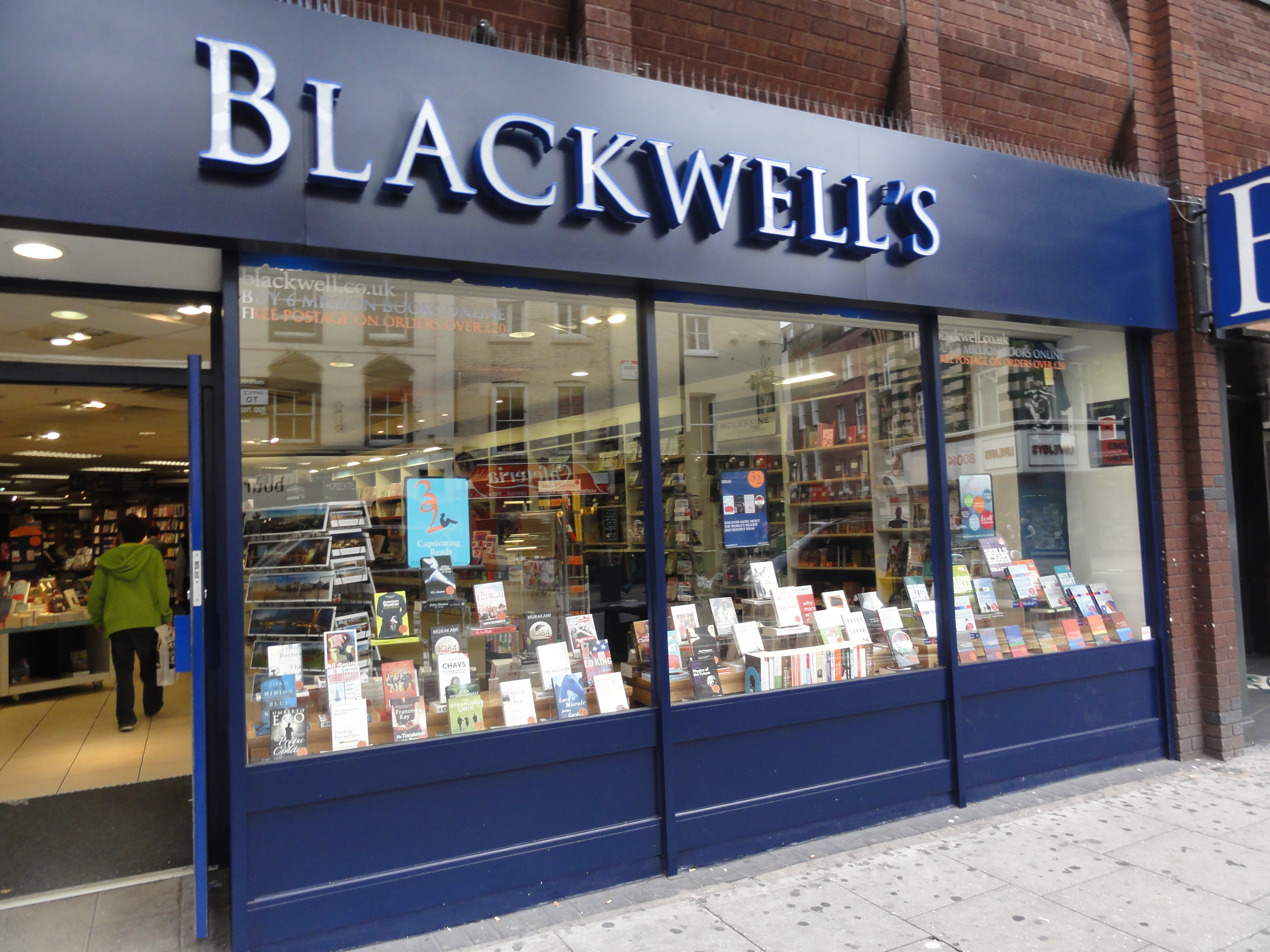
The former Charing Cross Road shop, London

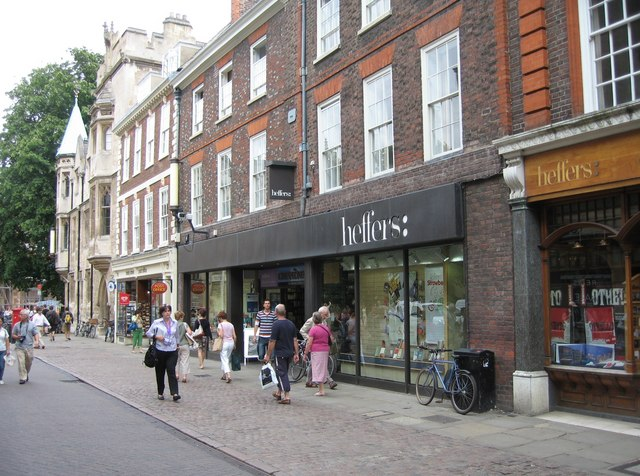
Heffers, Trinity Street, Cambridge

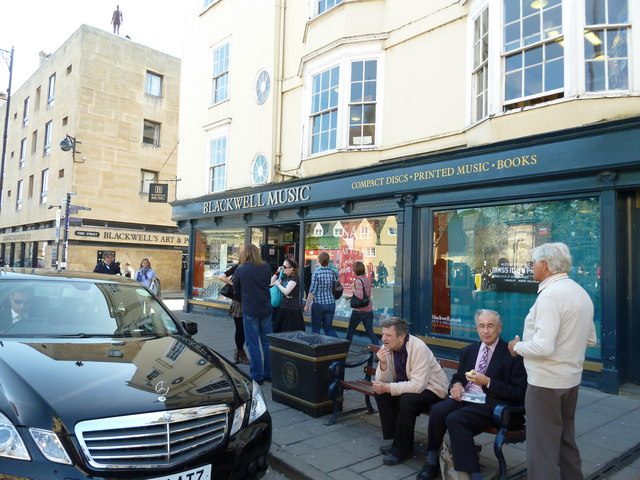
Blackwell's Music, previously at 23–25 Broad Street, Oxford

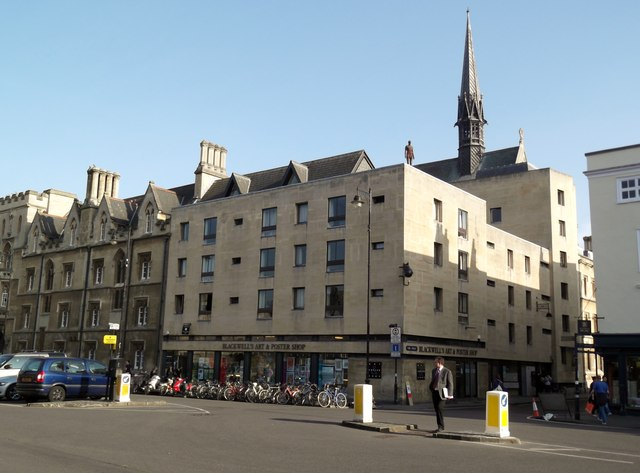
Blackwell's Art and Poster Shop, 27 Broad Street, Oxford

== See also ==
- Books in the United Kingdom
