= Nook Color =

Tablet computer/e-reader from Barnes & Noble

Barnes & Noble Nook Color
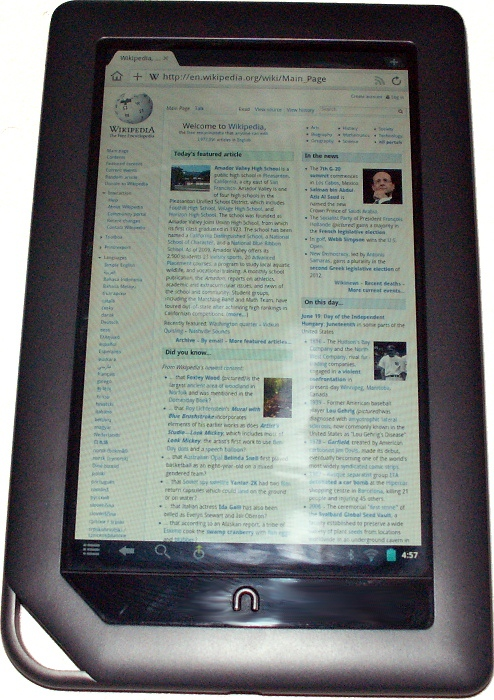
- The Wikipedia home page on a Nook Color
- Manufacturer: Barnes & Noble
- Released: 16 November 2010 (Wi-Fi only)
- Introductory price: US$249
- Operating system: Android 2.2 Froyo custom (software update - ver 1.4.3 [06/20/2012])
- CPU: 800 MHz ARM Cortex-A8-based TI OMAP3621
- Memory: 512 MB
- Storage: 8 GB internal 2 TB max via microSD
- Display: 7-inch 1024 x 600 px WSVGA IPS LCD at 170 ppi
- Graphics: PowerVR SGX 530
- Input: Capacitive multitouch screen with side volume, Nook Home, and power button
- Connectivity: Wi-Fi 802.11 b/g/n, USB, Bluetooth(Disabled on stock firmware)
- Power: Installed battery 3.7 v 4000 mAh (8 hours with Wi-Fi off)
- Dimensions: 8.1 in (210 mm) H 5.0 in (130 mm) W 0.48 in (12 mm) D
- Weight: 15.8 oz (450 g)
- Successor: Nook Tablet
- Website: Official website

The Nook Color is a tablet computer/e-reader that was marketed by Barnes & Noble. A 7-inch (18 cm) tablet with multitouch touchscreen input, it is the first device in the Nook line to feature a full-color screen. The device is designed for viewing of books, newspapers, magazines, and children's picture books. A limited number of the children's books available for the Nook Color include interactive animations and the option to have a professional voice actor read the story. It was announced on 26 October 2010 and shipped on 16 November 2010. Nook Color became available at the introductory price of US$249. In December 2011, with the release of the Nook Tablet, it lowered to US$169. On 12 August 2012, the price lowered to US$149. On 4 November 2012, the price was further lowered to US$139. The tablet ran on Android.

As of December 2012, Barnes and Noble discontinued the Nook Color in favor of the Nook HD and Nook HD+.

== Design ==
The device was designed by Yves Behar from fuseproject. Its frame is graphite in color, with an angled lower corner intended to evoke a turned page. The soft back is designed to make holding the device more comfortable.

== Features ==
The Nook color has a 7-inch (18 cm) 1024x600 resolution multi-touch touchscreen LCD, presenting a very vivid image, as opposed to the original Nook's 3.5-inch (9 cm) secondary touchscreen. It does not feature an electronic paper display, making it a tablet computer and an e-reader. It has a customized display with color options, six font sizes, and Internet browsing over Wi-Fi, as well as a built-in media player that supports audio and video. The Nook Color allows installing applications approved by Barnes & Noble, with the company planning to provide tools for third-party software developers and an app store. Applications pre-loaded on the Nook Color include Chess, Sudoku, crossword puzzles, Pandora Radio, and a media gallery for viewing pictures and video.

As with the prior Nook, the Nook Color provides a "LendMe" feature allowing users to share some books with other people depending upon licensing by the book's publisher. The purchaser is permitted to share a book once with one other user for up to two weeks. The other users may view the borrowed book using a Nook, Nook Color, or Barnes & Noble's free reader software on any other device running iOS (iPhone, iPod Touch, iPad), BlackBerry OS, Windows, Mac OS X, or Android. Adobe Digital Editions installed on Laptops paired to the Nook Color enables downloads from public libraries (epub). The Share feature on the Nook is only accessible to a small percentage of books purchased from B&N. The Nook works better and easier with purchased publications from B&N than other sources with its easier access.

The Nook Color uses a Texas Instruments ARM Cortex-A8 processor running at 800 MHz which can be overclocked to 1.1 GHz. The device has 8 GB of internal memory supplied by Sandisk, but only 6 GB is user-accessible witch can be 1GB data 5GB media or 1GB data 5GB media depending on date purchased and can store an estimated 6,000 books or 100 hours of audio. As with the original Nook, microSD and microSDHC memory cards can be inserted to expand the Nook Color's memory up to 2TB Although Barnes & Noble's official position is that the Nook Color's rechargeable battery is not user-replaceable, replacement instructions and aftermarket batteries are widely available. The original battery is expected to last for 8 hours of continuous use with the wireless turned off, but some replacements have less capacity. The device includes a built-in speaker and a universal 3.5 mm stereo headphone jack. VividView technology is used to enhance image quality when viewing in direct sunlight. Supported file formats include EPUB (DRM and non-DRM), PDF, Microsoft Office formats (DOC, DOCX, XLS, PPT, etc.), TXT, JPEG, GIF, PNG, BMP, MP3, AAC, and MP4.

A firmware update released 25 April 2011 added an app store, email client, Flash support within the web browser, social networking tools, video and audio embedded within books, and performance improvements.

It also has been discovered that the device has hidden Bluetooth connectivity abilities in its wireless chipset, available only after rooting, or flashing a device to the CyanogenMod 7 or newer version of Android for this device.

=== Third-party apps and firmware update 1.4.1 ===
When the Nook Color and Tablet were first offered, users could install third-party apps. However, days before Christmas 2011, the forced over-the-air "firmware update from Barnes & Noble for the Nook Tablet and Nook Color – 1.4.1 – close[d] the loophole that allowed users to sideload any Android app and also [broke] root for those who'[d] gone that extra step to customize the device."

== Reception ==
Since launch, Nook Color received generally positive reviews, with PC Magazine declaring "Nook Color makes a perfectly amiable reading companion if you want to see your books in full color", while Engadget says "if you're a hardcore reader with an appetite that extends beyond books to magazines and newspapers, the Color is the first viable option we've seen that can support your habit".

In late March 2011, it was reported that the Nook Color had sold close to 3 million units since its launch.

== Use as an Android tablet ==
As an Android device, the Nook Color can be modified to run most Android applications. One common method that unlocks this function is rooting, which grants users root access to the Nook Color's file system. Doing so voids the device's warranty, though it can often be returned to (non-rooted) factory defaults for warranty claims.

In addition to rooting the stock operating system, complete versions of Android are available that can replace the stock firmware and provide functions similar to other Android devices. Android versions 2.2 (Froyo) 2.3 (Gingerbread), 4.0 (Ice Cream Sandwich) 4.1-4.3 (Jelly Bean) and 4.4 (KitKat) have all been fully ported to the Nook Color and are available as free downloads.

Perhaps the most popular such replacement is CyanogenMod 11, an enhanced version of Android 4.4 (Kitkat), which, as of September 2013, has over 55,000 reported installations on the Nook Color (codenamed "encore"). CyanogenMod is a community-developed firmware replacement that can be downloaded for free. It can be installed to the internal storage or started from a microSD card, which typically will not affect the internal installation. Neither replacing the stock operating system nor running the operating system from a microSD card requires rooting.

Many people have reported that CM11 runs with less lag than CM10.

== USB port ==
The original Nook used a standard Micro USB connection for both battery charging and PC connectivity. The Nook Color uses a modified connector with two depths. The first depth is compatible with Micro USB (5-conductor), while the second depth has 12 conductors. This change was made to increase the amount of power available to charge the larger battery of the Nook Color when using the included cable at 2A as opposed to the 0.5 A limit of standard USB connections.

Because of this, the USB cable included with the Nook Color is physically incompatible with other devices employing standard micro-USB connectors. However, the Nook Color itself is physically compatible with standard micro-USB cords and will still charge at a slower rate on such cords.
