= List of filename extensions (0–9) =

This alphabetical list of filename extensions contains extensions of notable file formats used by multiple notable applications or services.

Ext.	Description	Used by
3DS	Cartridge game format for Nintendo 3DS	Nintendo 3DS Family
3DSX	Homebrew file for Nintendo 3DS	Homebrew launcher (3ds)
3G2	Mobile phone video	
3GP	Mobile phone video	
3GX	Luma3DS Plugin	Luma3DS
3MF	3D manufacturing format	3D builder
3MM	Legacy binary project file that stores instructions for an animated movie	Microsoft 3D Movie Maker
7z	A compressed archive file format that supports several different data compression, encryption and pre-processing algorithms	7-zip
4TH	Forth language source code file	Forth development systems

== See also ==
- List of filename extensions
- List of file formats
