= TeachingBooks.net =

Book database

TeachingBooks.net is an website containing children's books, young adult literature, and information on their authors. The site contains educational materials and programs (short movies, audiobook readings, book discussion guides) that add a multimedia dimension to reading. The headquarters of TeachingBooks.net is in Madison, Wisconsin. The company and database were founded by Nick Glass. The company was acquired by OverDrive, Inc. in 2021.

== History ==
The database was founded upon the premise that educators find enjoyment and professional value in seeing and hearing authors talk about their work. Nick Glass, the founder, had hosted many author presentations in his previous work — bringing authors to bookstores, schools, libraries, and conferences — and had arranged live author programs for educators over a distance-learning video network.

The database debuted at the American Library Association convention in San Francisco in June 2001 and was launched on the Internet September 1, 2001. It began selling licenses in November 2003.

== Uses ==
TeachingBooks.net can be used in both educational and home settings. Educators can use the site to host virtual author visits so students can learn from professional writers via audio and video resources. Movies of Caldecott-winning illustrators demonstrate art processes. Audio excerpts are used by students, including English language learners, to independently learn the rhythm, pace, and sound of the books they are reading. Users can also listen to poets read their work, get information for author/illustrator studies, and find book guides for fiction and non-fiction titles.

== Content ==
TeachingBooks.net specializes in creating original content with authors and illustrators. Staff from the database interview children's and young adult authors in their homes to create brief Author Program videos.

In the Original Author Program videos, authors discuss journaling, doing research, storytelling, reader's theatre, bringing history to life, and working with inspiring ideas. Illustrators show techniques they use to create picture books, graphic novels, and more.

Staff at TeachingBooks.net also call authors to record original book readings, in which authors share the inspiration behind their books and read brief excerpts.

== Pronunciation guide ==
The TeachingBooks.net Author Name Pronunciation Guide is an online audio collection of authors and illustrators pronouncing their names. Authors dial in to a toll-free number and leave a voice message in which they pronounce their name and share the history of their name. The Author Name Pronunciation Guide is available free and does not require a subscription to TeachingBooks.net.
