= The Nook =

The Nook may refer to:

- The Nook, Shropshire, a United Kingdom location
- The Nook, Isle of Man, an element of race courses
- The Nook (Spring Garden Township, Pennsylvania), a historic home

== See also ==
- Nook (disambiguation)
