= OverDrive, Inc. =

American digital distributor of digital entertainment

- Type: Private
- Industry: Digital distribution, ebooks, library services, school services, software and app development, digital content management, publishing
- Founded: 1986 in Cleveland, Ohio (40 years)
- Headquarters: Cleveland, Ohio, United States
- Area served: Worldwide
- Key people: Marc DeBevoise (CEO & president): Steve Potash (Founder)
- Products: Libby, Kanopy, Sora, TeachingBooks.net
- Owner: Rakuten (2015–2020); KKR & Co. (2020–present)
- Website: overdrive.com

OverDrive, Inc. is a worldwide digital distributor of ebooks, audiobooks, online magazines and streaming video titles. The company provides digital rights management and download fulfillment services for publishers, public libraries, K–12 schools, colleges, universities, corporations, legal industries, and formerly retailers.

The largest commercial provider of ebooks, audiobooks, and other digital content such as streaming videos in the world, a 2023 report estimated its market share as perhaps being upwards of 90%.^{:11} OverDrive operates the ebook and audiobook app Libby, the video streaming app Kanopy, and the educational app Sora.

== History ==
OverDrive was founded in 1986 and originally converted analog media to digital formats, such as interactive diskettes and CD-ROMs. In 2000, the company opened Content Reserve, an online eBook and downloadable audiobook repository from which its distribution business developed.

Before entering the library market, OverDrive distributed eBooks to online stores. In 2002, OverDrive was selected as the distributor of HarperCollins’ eBooks to the publisher's online retail stores. OverDrive launched web stores for Harlequin Enterprises in 2005. In 2008, OverDrive announced that it would provide download services for Borders Books.

On September 21, 2011, OverDrive began supporting Kindle public library book borrowing.

In 2012, the company announced a series of service upgrades, including a browser-based eReader, and audiobook streaming, which enabled access to audiobooks via the company’s OverDrive Media Console app. The company also developed a media station, which allows users to browse their library's digital collection on touchscreen monitors and internet workstations. An API is available which allows developers to integrate OverDrive content into various apps and platforms. The company announced a partnership with LexisNexis to provide the LexisNexis Digital Library, a customized eLending platform for the legal library market. Nokia partnered with OverDrive to launch Nokia Reading, an eReading app and service for Nokia's Lumia 900, 800, 710, and 610 Windows Phone devices.

In 2014, OverDrive completed its headquarters in the Cleveland suburb of Garfield Heights, Ohio.

In April 2015, Rakuten bought OverDrive for $410 million, with the deal set to close in April 2015. OverDrive CEO Steve Potash remained in his position and OverDrive kept its name while operating under Rakuten USA.

In 2019, it was reported that private equity firm KKR would be purchasing OverDrive from Rakuten. The estimate market value was $775 million in 2019.^{:11} The acquisition was finalized in June 2020.

In June 2020, RBMedia sold its library assets to OverDrive; this includes RBDigital, an app and service for the distribution of digital content. RBMedia and OverDrive are both owned by KKR, with KKR's OverDrive purchase concluded in June 2020. The sale of RBMedia's library division to OverDrive represents a merger of KKR's related assets.

On June 9, 2021, it was announced that OverDrive would acquire Kanopy, an on-demand streaming video platform for public and academic libraries. The acquisition was completed on July 15, 2021.

In March of 2023, the company announced plans to sunset its flagship OverDrive app on May 1, 2023. OverDrive transitioned its users over to the Libby reading app, which allows public, corporate, and academic library systems to provide digital content to members of their respective library's network. The content consists of digital books, audiobooks, magazines and an extras section displaying all the databases and streaming media services that public, corporate and academic libraries have to offer to their users.

In March 2026, Marc DeBevoise was named president of OverDrive. In June 2026, DeBevoise was named CEO of OverDrive.

== Reception ==
=== Connection to local library ===
The 2023 American Library Association report on the Digital Public Library Ecosystem found that younger users of the apps largely did not realize that local libraries paid for the services they received through apps like OverDrive's Libby.^{:13}

=== Data privacy ===
The 2023 American Library Association report on the Digital Public Library Ecosystem could not determine what user data Amazon could use and access from books read on the Kindle app through the partnership with Libby.^{:11-12}

=== State funding ===
In March of 2025, the Missouri Secretary of State Denny Hoskins suspended state funding to OverDrive for use in K-12 school libraries pending investigation of "allegations regarding inappropriate materials accessible to minors." The news release announcing the suspension did not provide any details on the nature or source of the allegations. In response to the funding suspension, the Missouri Library Association stated that school librarians have direct control over what materials students can access on OverDrive's platforms, and that librarians are able to categorize access based on students' age to ensure that younger students cannot access materials that are suited for older students.

== See also ==
- Adobe Content Server
- Axis360
- Digital library
- Hoopla (digital media service)
- Publishing
