= List of Microsoft Office filename extensions =

The following is a list of filename extensions used by programs in the Microsoft Office suite.

== Word ==
Legacy
Legacy filename extensions denote binary Microsoft Word formatting that became outdated with the release of Microsoft Office 2007. Although the latest version of Microsoft Word can still open them, they are no longer developed. Legacy filename extensions include:

- .doc – Legacy Word document; Microsoft Office refers to them as "Microsoft Word 97–2003 Document"
- .dot – Legacy Word templates; officially designated "Microsoft Word 97–2003 Template"
- .wbk – Legacy Word document backup; referred as "Microsoft Word Backup Document"

OOXML
Office Open XML (OOXML) format was introduced with Microsoft Office 2007 and became the default format of Microsoft Word ever since. Pertaining file extensions include:

- .docx – Word document
- .docm – Word macro-enabled document; same as docx, but may contain macros and scripts
- .dotx – Word template
- .dotm – Word macro-enabled template; same as dotx, but may contain macros and scripts

Other formats

- .pdf – PDF documents
- .wll – Word add-in
- .wwl – Word add-in

== Excel ==
Legacy
Legacy filename extensions denote binary Microsoft Excel formats that became outdated with the release of Microsoft Office 2007. Although the latest version of Microsoft Excel can still open them, they are no longer developed. Legacy filename extensions include:

- .xls – Legacy Excel worksheets; officially designated "Microsoft Excel 97–2003 Worksheet" or "Microsoft Excel 5.0/95 Workbook"
- .xlt – Legacy Excel templates; officially designated "Microsoft Excel 97–2003 Template"
- .xlm – Legacy Excel macro

OOXML
Office Open XML (OOXML) format was introduced with Microsoft Office 2007 and became the default format of Microsoft Excel ever since. Excel-related file extensions of this format include:

- .xlsx – Excel workbook
- .xlsm – Excel macro-enabled workbook; same as xlsx but may contain macros and scripts
- .xltx – Excel template
- .xltm – Excel macro-enabled template; same as xltx but may contain macros and scripts

Other formats
Microsoft Excel uses dedicated file formats that are not part of OOXML, and use the following extensions:

- .xlsb – Excel binary worksheet (BIFF12)
- .xla – Excel add-in that can contain macros
- .xlam – Excel macro-enabled add-in
- .xll – Excel XLL add-in; a form of DLL-based add-in
- .xlw – Excel work space; previously known as "workbook"
- .xll_ – Excel 4 for Mac add-in
- .xla_ – Excel 4 for Mac add-in
- .xla5 – Excel 5 for Mac add-in
- .xla8 – Excel 98 for Mac add-in

== PowerPoint ==
Legacy

- .ppt – Legacy PowerPoint presentation
- .pot – Legacy PowerPoint template
- .pps – Legacy PowerPoint slideshow
- .ppa – Legacy PowerPoint add-in

OOXML

- .pptx – PowerPoint presentation
- .pptm – PowerPoint macro-enabled presentation
- .potx – PowerPoint template
- .potm – PowerPoint macro-enabled template
- .ppam – PowerPoint add-in
- .ppsx – PowerPoint slideshow
- .ppsm – PowerPoint macro-enabled slideshow
- .sldx – PowerPoint slide
- .sldm – PowerPoint macro-enabled slide

== Access ==
Microsoft Access 2007 introduced new file extensions:

- .accda – Access add-in file
- .accdb – Access Database
- .accde – The file extension for Office Access 2007 files that are in "execute only" mode. ACCDE files have all Visual Basic for Applications (VBA) source code hidden. A user of an ACCDE file can only execute VBA code, but not view or modify it. ACCDE takes the place of the MDE file extension.
- .accdr – is a new file extension that enables you to open a database in runtime mode. By simply changing a database's file extension from .accdb to .accdr, you can create a "locked-down" version of your Office Access database. You can change the file extension back to .accdb to restore full functionality.
- .accdt – The file extension for Access Database Templates.
- .accdu – Access add-in file

== Other ==
- .one – OneNote export file
- .ecf – Outlook 2013+ add-in file
- .pub – a Microsoft Publisher publication

== See also ==
- Microsoft Office XML formats – File format family introduced at Microsoft Office XP and Microsoft Office 2003
- Lists of filename extensions
