= Hoopla (digital media service) =

North American provider of digital media for public libraries

Hoopla Digital
- Industry: eBooks, Library Services, School Services, Digital Content Management
- Genre: Software, media playback
- Founded: 2013; 13 years ago
- Headquarters: Holland, OH, United States
- Area served: USA, Canada, Australia, and New Zealand
- Products: Hoopla Digital
- Parent: Midwest Tape (2013–present)
- Website: www.hoopladigital.com

Hoopla Digital is a web and mobile streaming platform launched in 2013 that provides access to a wide range of digital media, including audiobooks, eBooks, comics, manga, music, movies, and TV shows. The service is available to users through participating public libraries, allowing library cardholders to borrow and stream digital media.

Hoopla is a division of Midwest Tape.

== History ==
Hoopla was launched in 2013. Its goal was for libraries to provide patrons with access to digital content such as audiobooks, music, movies, and TV shows, without the need for holds or waiting lists. Hoopla's model is a pay-per-use system, which means patrons can borrow items instantly. Since its inception, the service has expanded its offerings to include eBooks and comics. The app was built exclusively for public libraries and their patrons. Hoopla Digital is the only platform that combines all formats and all license models into one convenient app with no platform fees.

In 2017, Hoopla became available on Apple TV, Amazon Fire TV, Android TV, and Roku, allowing users to stream content on larger screens. In 2020, Hoopla Flex and Bonus Borrows programs are introduced, enabling libraries to move their one copy/one user titles. At that time, there were 6.5 million library card holders and 2,700+ library partners. In 2021, the BingePass was introduced, offering patrons seven days to access entire collections with just one borrow. In 2022, Apple CarPlay and Android Auto become available, giving users safe and easy access while driving. In 2023, manga joins Hoopla's comic collection, adding 1.5 million titles to Hoopla's offerings. In January 2025, Hoopla introduced a new streaming feature called SeasonPass. Building on the existing BingePass model, SeasonPass allows users to borrow an entire season of a television series with a single borrow.

== Business model ==
Hoopla is free of charge for patrons of participating libraries. The content is paid for by library systems, using a "per circulation transaction model".

== Content ==
Hoopla claims to have over 500,000 content titles across six formats, including over 25,000 comic books. As of November 2016, Hoopla's content comprised 35% audiobooks (for which Hoopla has contracts with publishers such as Blackstone Audio, HarperCollins, Simon & Schuster Audio, Tantor Audio, and others), followed by 22% movies (for which Hoopla has motion picture contracts with publishers such as Disney, Lionsgate, Starz, Warner Bros., and others), 19% music, 12% ebooks, 6% comics, and 6% television. One drawback is that Hoopla has few new bestsellers.

In February 2025, 404 Media reported that Hoopla's collection includes books created by generative AI with fictional authors and dubious quality. Often not labeled as AI-produced or fact-checked, this AI slop can cost libraries money when checked out by unsuspecting patrons.

Libraries like Sacramento Public library have questioned the sustainability of Hoopla's pay-per-use model and have considered transitioning to other digital platforms.

=== Areas served ===
Hoopla expanded to serve Australia and New Zealand in June 2021.

== Technology ==
Hoopla content can be borrowed and consumed on the web, or via the native Android or iOS apps. Hoopla broadcasts only in Standard definition unlike most of its competitors such as Kanopy.

== Parent company ==
John Eldred and Jeff Jankowski founded Hoopla's parent company, Midwest Tape, in 1989. Midwest Tape is a library vendor of physical media such as audiobooks, CDs, and DVD/Blu-ray.

== Controversy ==
Hoopla and Midwest Tapes were censured by the Library Freedom Project and Library Futures in a joint statement for hosting what it described as "fascist propaganda", including a recent English translation of A New Nobility of Blood and Soil by Richard Walther Darré of the SS and books related to Holocaust denial, in public library collections without the input from the staff. Criticism was also directed at the inclusion of books on homosexuality, abortion, and vaccines claimed by the Library Freedom Project and Library Futures to be misinformation. On February 17, 2022, Hoopla removed a number of titles after public outcry about Holocaust denial books available on the app under non-fiction. The advocacy groups expressed appreciation for the response, however state that it is "insufficient," as they maintain concerns about the company's practices in selecting materials and lack of transparency.

== See also ==
- CloudLibrary
- Libby
- Libro.fm – audiobook app
