= Nook Tablet =

2011 tablet e-reader and media player

- Manufacturer: Barnes & Noble
- Type: Lithium ion, 11.5 hours reading or 9 hours of video on a charge
- Released: November 17, 2011
- Introductory price: MSRP: $179 (8 GB) or $199 (16 GB)
- Units sold: 5 million (in mid-October 2012)
- Operating system: Android 2.3 Gingerbread with customized UI
- CPU: 1 GHz TI OMAP4 dual-core
- Memory: 512 MB or 1 GB RAM
- Storage: 8 or 16 GB internal storage, microSDHC expands up to 32 GB
- Display: 7-inch VividView color touchscreen 16 million+ colors, IPS2 display, 1024 X 600, 169 pixels per inch (PPI)
- Graphics: PowerVR SGX540
- Input: Capacitive multitouch screen
- Connectivity: Wireless via Wi-Fi 802.11b/g/n
- Power: Installed rechargeable battery
- Dimensions: 8.1 in (206 mm) H 5.0 in (127 mm) W 0.48 in (12.2 mm) D
- Weight: 14.1 oz (400 g)
- Predecessor: Nook Color
- Successor: Nook HD
- Website: Official website

The Nook Tablet (sometimes styled NOOK Tablet) is a tablet e-reader/media player that was produced and marketed by Barnes & Noble. It followed the Nook Color and was intended to compete with both e-book readers and tablet computers.

Barnes & Noble announced the Nook Tablet 16 GB version on November 7, 2011; the device became available on November 17 for US$249. Barnes & Noble released the Nook Tablet 8 GB on February 21, 2012. Both versions have a 7-inch (18 cm) screen, a microSDHC slot compatible with cards up to 32 GB in size, 8 or 16 GB of internal storage, a 1 GHz dual-core processor, and a FAT32 file system. Additionally, the 16 GB model has 1 GB of RAM, ROM of 16 GB eMMC, and 11 GB of storage capacity; the 8 GB model has 512 MB of RAM and ROM of 8 GB eMMC. The Nook Tablet models were discontinued shortly after the release of the Nook HD and Nook HD+.

According to estimates by Forrester Research, about 5 million units were sold by mid-October 2012, making the Nook Tablet the third best selling tablet after Apple's iPad and Amazon's Kindle Fire in 2012.

== Design ==
The device is based on the Nook Color design by Yves Béhar from fuseproject. Its frame is gray in color, with an angled lower corner intended to evoke a turned page. The textured back is designed to make holding the device comfortable.

== Supported file types ==
- E-books: EPUB (including Adobe DRM or DRM free), PDF files, and CBZ files
- Other documents: XLS, DOC, PPT, TXT, DOCM, XLSM, PPTM, PPSX, PPSM, DOCX, XLSX, PPTX
- Audio: MP3, MP4, AAC, AMR, WAV, Ogg (Audio codecs: MP3, AAC, AMR, LPCM, Vorbis)
- Images: JPEG, GIF (animated GIF is not supported), PNG, BMP
- Videos : MP4, Adobe Flash, 3GP, 3G2, MKV, WebM (Video codecs: H.264, MPEG-4, H.263, VP8)

== Comparison ==
=== 16 GB version ===
The 16 GB version was announced on November 7, 2011, and became available on November 17 for US $249. Of the 16 GB internal storage, 13 GB is available for content, with only 1 GB available for sideloaded, non-Barnes & Noble content. Barnes & Noble announced that from March 12, 2012, users could bring their Nook Tablets 16 GB into stores for repartitioning to increase the internal storage for sideloaded content. On August 12, 2012, Barnes & Noble lowered the price to US$199 to compete with the Kindle Fire. On November 4, 2012, the price was further reduced to US$179.

=== 8 GB version ===
On February 22, 2012, Barnes & Noble released the Nook Tablet 8 GB at US $199 to compete with the Kindle Fire. The differences from the 16 GB model are: 512 MB RAM and 8 GB of internal storage, of which 5 GB is available for user content and 1 GB is reserved for NOOK Store content On August 12, 2012, Barnes & Noble lowered the price to $179. On November 4, 2012, the price was further reduced to US $159.

== Modification ==
=== Rooting ===
Developers have found means to root the device, which provides access to hidden files and settings, making it possible to run apps that require deep access to a file system or make changes to your device. For instance you can use apps to back up or restore all of the apps on your device. Numerous websites offer downloadable software and step-by-step directions to do-it-yourselfers.

=== Third-party apps and firmware update 1.4.1 ===
When the Nook Tablet was first offered, users could install third-party apps. However, days before Christmas 2011, the forced over-the-air "firmware update from Barnes & Noble for the Nook Tablet and Nook Color — 1.4.1 — close[d] the loophole that allowed users to sideload any Android app and also [broke] root for those who’[d] gone that extra step to customize the device.

=== Alternative operating systems ===
In addition to the stock firmware provided by Barnes and Noble, the Nook Tablet can run free, third-party, alternative Android operating systems such as CyanogenMod. These replacement distributions typically include advanced tablet features such as overclocking, a regular Android tablet interface, and access to competing app and content stores such as the Google Play and Amazon Appstore. Alternative operating systems may be run either from the eMMC chip or via a microSD card, which allows multi-booting. When the card is in the slot, the Nook Tablet will start from the operating system on the SD card. Otherwise, it will boot from the eMMC.

While much of the replacement firmware for the Nook Tablet is available via free downloads, and instructions are readily available to install to either external microSD cards or internal storage, pre-installed versions on microSD cards are also available for sale by vendors who have tested and developed error-free versions and instructions for the free software and offer it for a price and in some cases, along with customer service and user forums.
