= Midwest Tape =

Business in Holland, United States

Midwest Tape, LLC
- Type: Limited liability company
- Industry: eBooks, Library Services, Software and App Development, Digital Content Management, Publishing
- Founded: 1989; 37 years ago in Holland, Ohio
- Founder: John Eldred Jr.
- Headquarters: Holland, OH, United States
- Area served: Worldwide
- Key people: Jeff Jankowski (President and CEO)
- Products: physical and digital fulfillment services for libraries and publishers
- Number of employees: 350
- Website: www.midwesttape.com

Midwest Tape LLC is a full-service distributor serving the public library sector. The company specializes in shelf-ready DVDs, Blu-rays, physical audiobooks, and similar merchandise that libraries can purchase "pre-processed" with the needed bar codes, labels, RFID, and other tags necessary for libraries. The Midwest Tape catalog includes more than 13 million titles.

== History ==
Midwest Tape LLC was founded in 1989 and is located in Holland, Ohio. Its origins trace back to 1983 in which, John Eldred, the owner of a video rental store "Sights and Sounds" in Toledo, Ohio, was encouraged by a customer to sell used VHS tapes to public libraries. Subsequently, selling VHS tapes to public libraries became a significant part of the "Sights and Sounds" business. Then, in 1989, John Eldred founded Midwest Tape to specifically serve the public library market.

== Subsidiaries ==
Hoopla: a web and mobile platform for accessing digital content through public libraries.
