= Benjamin Henry Blackwell =

English bookseller and politician (1849–1924)

Benjamin Henry Blackwell (10 January 1849 – 26 October 1924) was an English bookseller and politician who founded the Blackwell's chain of bookshops in Oxford.

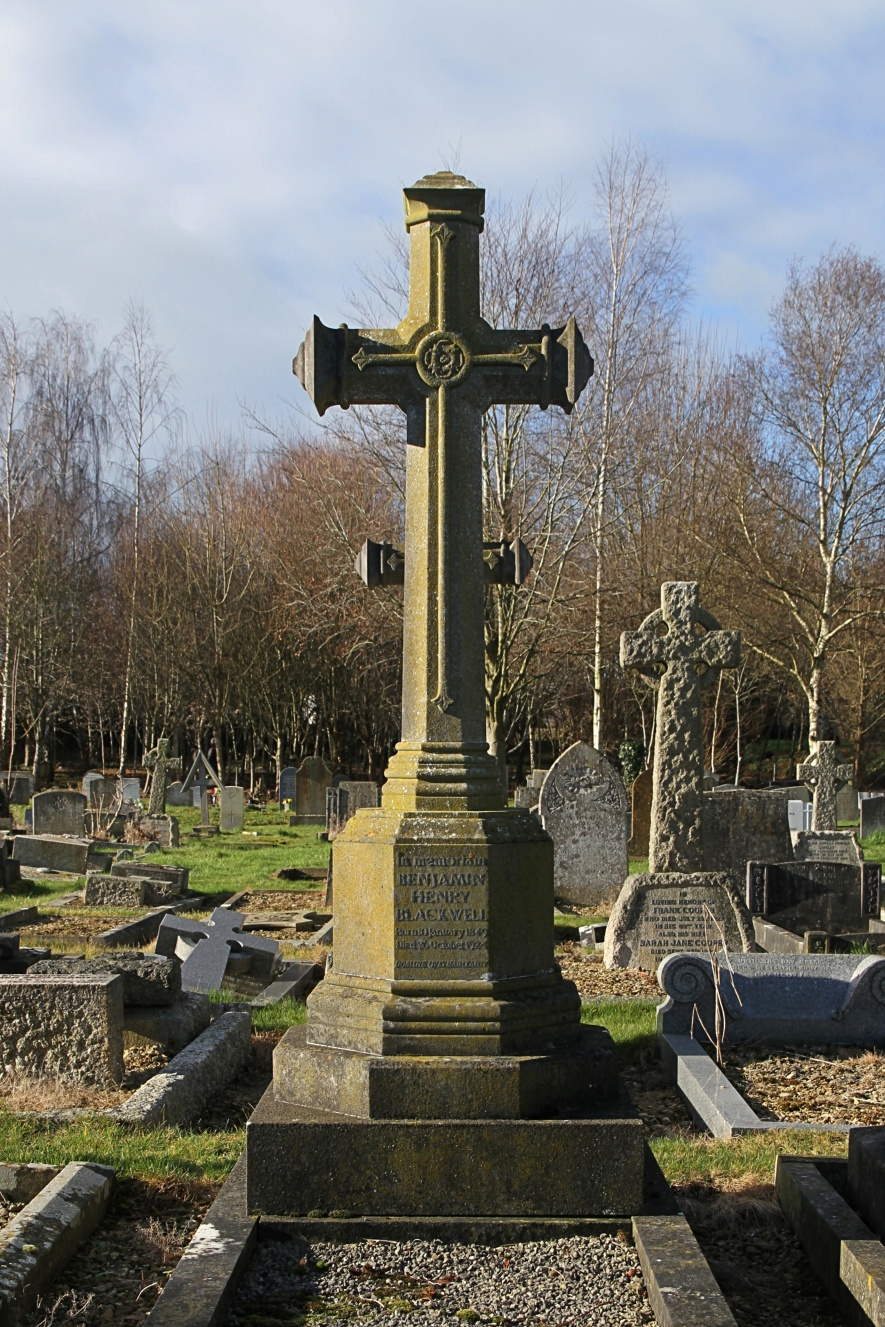
Blackwell's gravestone in Wolvercote Cemetery, Oxford

Blackwell was born at 46 High Street, St Clement's, Oxford, the son of librarian Benjamin Harris Blackwell and Nancy "Ann" Stirling Lambert. He left formal education aged 13, working as an apprentice for local bookseller Charles Richards. He hoped to become a librarian like his father, but his application for the post of City Librarian for Cardiff was turned down due to his lack of formal education. An entry from his diary shows that in spite of this setback, Blackwell intended to continue working in the book trade:

I have now been with Mr Rose six years and seem likely to stay for a year or two, at the end of which I hope to be able with a little assistance to open in London or elsewhere a business on my own account."

In 1879 he opened his own shop, B.H. Blackwell's, on Broad Street in Oxford. The local profile he gained as a result enabled him to successfully campaign for political office, and he served as Liberal councillor for Oxford North.

Blackwell received the Freedom of the City of London in 1920. He died in 1924, and his widow Lilla died in 1928.
