= Lists of filename extensions =

Lists of filename extensions include:

- List of filename extensions (0–9)
- List of filename extensions (A–E)
- List of filename extensions (F–L)
- List of filename extensions (M–R)
- List of filename extensions (S–Z)

== See also ==
- Filename extension
- List of file formats
