= VividView =

Comparison between non-vividview & vividview screens in direct sunlight.

VividView Processor is the world's first LSI for improving visibility in displays when exposed to direct sunlight, while reducing power consumption at the same time. The technology was developed by Fujitsu Ten in cooperation with Fujitsu Semiconductor Limited and Fujitsu Laboratories.

== Features of VividView Processor 3 ==
- Highly visible display even in direct sunlight
- Energy conservation through backlight control
- Sharp, clear, and vivid display of images

== VividView technology overview ==
Vivid View Processor 3

=== Color correction in direct sunlight ===
1. Immediate correction of tone and saturation
  First the image is analyzed and differences in tone are assigned to each area of the image. Then, "pinpoint correction" magnifies the contrast in even the brightest regions, and "tone correction" adjusts dark areas to a lighter tone that will stand out better. Finally, "saturation correction" limits the dilution of color and brightens the image. The combination of this technology improves visibility through the immediate and automatic correction of contrast and saturation in dark areas.
2. Adjustment of correction strength based on the brightness of direct sunlight
  A sensor detects the brightness of sunlight, which can fluctuate for a variety of reasons (season, time of day, location). Correction strength is adjusted based on brightness level, to achieve optimal image correction according to the degree of deterioration in image quality. A rapid response allows adjustments to be made even during repeated and drastic changes in bright sunlight in a short period of time.

=== Backlight control ===
1. Power consumption of display reduced 54% maximum, 24% average
2. Energy conserved in backlight while limiting deterioration in image quality
  Image data is analyzed for each scene to provide optimal brightness: low-level brightness for dark images, and higher-level brightness for light images. The brightness level of the image data is corrected according to the brightness of the backlight, to maintain the same appearance as the original image.
