= Libby (service) =

Digital library application

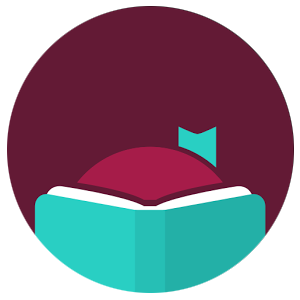
- Logo of Libby

- Libby mobile app
- Developer: OverDrive, Inc.
- Release: June 2017; 9 years ago
- Operating system: iOS, Android, web
- Available in: 15 languages
- List of languages Chinese (Simplified and Traditional) English; Danish; French (Canada); German; Icelandic; Italian; Japanese; Korean; Malay; Māori; Russian; Spanish (Latin America); Swedish; Tamil
- Type: Digital library
- License: Proprietary
- Website: libbyapp.com

Libby is a proprietary web and mobile app developed by OverDrive, Inc. that allows users to borrow ebooks, audiobooks, and other digital materials from public libraries. Users access content by linking a library card, and borrowed items can be read or listened to within the app.

The service is free for users and offered by public libraries, who pay to license digital materials. Libby is widely used in North America.

== History ==
Libby is a proprietary service and not classified as free or open-source software.

=== Founding and early history ===
Libby was introduced for beta testing in December 2016 and officially launched in June 2017. It was developed by OverDrive, Inc. as a successor to its earlier OverDrive Read and OverDrive Listen platforms. Both Libby and OverDrive are owned by private equity firm KKR. The app aimed to simplify and modernize the digital borrowing process. Libby's founding research was based on 36,000 library partners, analyzing one billion digital books borrowed. Libby's Catalog Guides organize materials by audience, genre, language, and theme. The app also includes recommendation features based on user activity. The homepage showcases new and trending picks at the library readers are linked to, as well as staff picks, seasonal selections, and themed media. Libby also has a feature called "Send to Kindle," which lets users transfer borrowed books onto their Kindle app or e-reader. This feature was originally introduced in the OverDrive app. However, this feature is only available in US libraries.

=== Libby Book Awards established ===
In 2023, the Libby Book Awards were established, recognizing librarian-recommended books across multiple categories, with a voting system of over 1,700 librarians. The first annual contest was held in 2024 and featured winners for Fiction, Nonfiction, Young Adult, Audiobook, Debut Author, Diverse Author, Comic Graphic Novel, Memoir & Autobiography, Cookbook, Mystery, Thriller, Romance, Fantasy, Romantasy, Science Fiction, Historical Fiction, and Book Club Pick.

=== Modern developments ===
Since its launch, Libby has continued to evolve, with updates to interface and functionality to improve accessibility, user experience, and content discovery. In September 2025, Libby introduced a feature called Inspire Me, which uses artificial intelligence to provide book recommendations based on user prompts or previously saved titles.

== Reception ==
A reviewer for Literary Review of Canada praised Libby's management of reading data, including books read and books in queue for reading. A reviewer for Time called Libby one of the best apps of 2018. Popular Mechanics named Libby as one of the best apps of the 2010s.

Some have argued that Libby's business model, which depends on charging libraries for digital licenses that are timebound or limited to a certain number of uses, has diverted libraries' acquisitions budgets away from physical media toward increasingly expensive subscriptions, which do not contribute to the long-term growth of a library's underlying assets.

Growth in costs driven by Libby utilization has led some public libraries to impose digital borrowing limits.

In March 2025, Missouri Secretary of State Denny Hoskins paused funding to the Libby's parent company Overdrive until it could prove that it had safeguards barring children from accessing inappropriate content.

== See also ==
- Hoopla
- Kanopy
- Libro.fm
