= Nook HD =

2012 tablet e-reader and media player

Nook HD Tablets
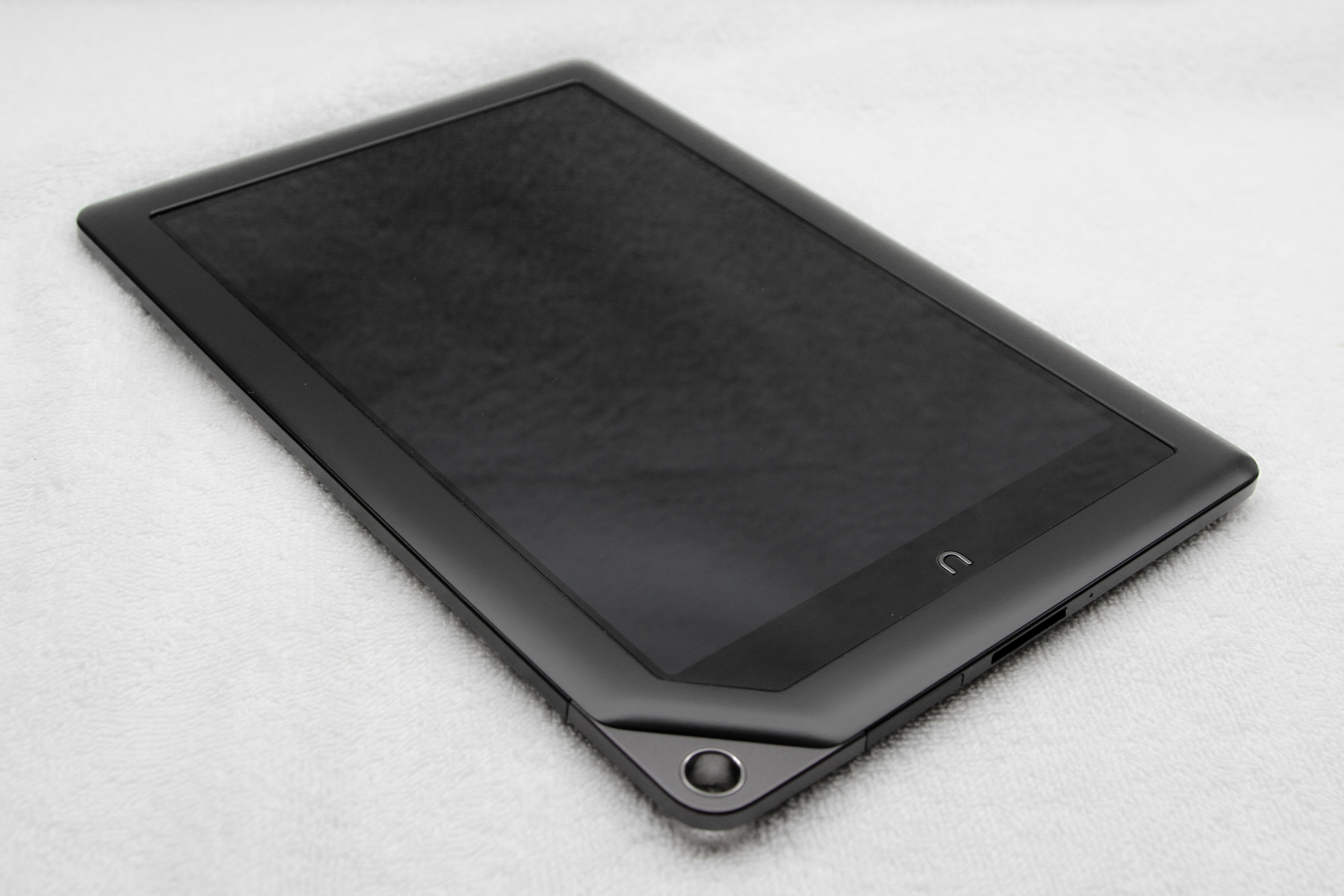
- The Nook HD+, the larger of the Nook HD series
- Manufacturer: Barnes & Noble
- Type: Tablet, media player, E-book reader
- Operating system: Android 4.0.3 with customized Nook User Interface; Unofficial Android versions without Nook (e.g. User Interface) software: Android 4.3 Jelly Bean and Android 4.4.4 KitKat
- System on a chip: Texas Instruments OMAP 4
- CPU: ARM Cortex-A9: 7" model: dual-core 4470 @ 1.3 GHz; 9" model: dual-core 4470 @ 1.5 GHz
- Memory: 1 GB RAM
- Storage: 7" model: Flash memory 8 or 16 GB and microSDXC slot currently allows adding up to 64 GB; 9" model: Flash memory 16 or 32 GB and microSDXC slot currently allows adding up to 64 GB
- Display: 7" model: LED Backlit screen (8:5, 1440×900 @ 243 PPI), 7 in (180 mm) diagonal; 9" model: LED Backlit screen (3:2, 1920×1280 @ 257 PPI), 9 in (230 mm) diagonal
- Graphics: Imagination Technologies PowerVR SGX544 and Vivante GC320 2D graphics core
- Input: Capacitive multitouch screen
- Connectivity: Wireless via Wi-Fi 802.11b/g/n Bluetooth
- Weight: 7" model: 315 g; 9" model: 515 g
- Predecessor: Nook Tablet
- Successor: Samsung Galaxy Tab 4 Nook (7.0" LCD) and Samsung Galaxy Tab 4 Nook (10.1" LCD)
- Website: Official website

The Nook HD and Nook HD+ are the third generation of Nook's line of color tablet e-reader/media players by Barnes & Noble for using their copy restricted (DRM) proprietary files, or other files. They are the successors to the Nook Tablet and both were released on November 8, 2012.

The 7-inch version, the Nook HD (also styled NOOK HD), is available in two internal memory sizes - 8 GB (US$129) with approximately 5 GB available for user content, and 16 GB (US$149) with about 13 GB available for user content. Memory is expandable via a microSD card (up to 64 GB). The Nook HD is available in two colors: Snow (white) and Smoke (black-grey).

A 9-inch version, the Nook HD+ (also styled NOOK HD+), is available with 32 GB ($179) of internal memory. Its memory is also expandable via a microSD card (up to 64 GB). The Nook HD+ is only available in one color, Slate (black-grey).

== History ==
Nook HD+ Lockscreen

When the devices were first introduced, purchasers of the Nook HD or Nook HD+ received an incentive of a $30 gift card to the Barnes & Noble shop. This expired in February 2013.

In May 2013, Barnes & Noble updated the Nook HD and HD+ to provide full access to the Google Play Store, which allowed users to install apps that were unavailable in the Nook Store.

In June 2013, Barnes & Noble announced they would stop making Nook tablets in-house. Later, Barnes & Noble changed its mind and said a new Nook tablet would be released. On June 25, 2013, Barnes & Noble announced it:

"is abandoning its Nook tablet hardware business and will instead rely on a 'partnership model for manufacturing in the competitive color tablet market' that will seek third-party manufacturers to build eReaders that run Nook software."

"The company plans to significantly reduce losses in the NOOK segment by limiting risks associated with manufacturing,” Barnes & Noble said in a press release. “Going forward, the company intends to continue to design eReading devices and reading platforms, while creating a partnership model for manufacturing in the competitive color tablet market. Thus, the widely popular lines of Simple Touch and Glowlight products will continue to be developed in house, and the company’s tablet line will be co-branded with yet to be announced third party manufacturers of consumer electronics products. At the same time, the company intends to continue to build its digital catalog, adding thousands of eBooks every week, and launching new NOOK Apps."

On August 20, 2013 CNET reported Barnes & Noble reversing the decision to eliminate the Color Nook devices:

"The bookseller will continue to design and make Nook color devices, with at least one new Nook set for the holiday season, as its chairman shelves a bid to buy the retail side."

In June 2014, Barnes & Noble announced it would be teaming up with Samsung to develop co-branded color tablet, the Samsung Galaxy Tab 4 Nook featuring Samsung's hardware with 7-inch and 10.1-inch displays and customized Nook software from Barnes & Noble. The Galaxy Tab 4 Nook began to be sold in the US in August 2014.

In March 2024, Barnes & Noble, decided that, starting in June, it would shut down the ability to log into a new Barnes & Noble or Nook account for Nook devices older than 2013.

== Modifying the Nook tablet ==
=== Rooting ===
Developers have found means to root the device, which provides access to hidden files and settings, making it possible to run apps that require deep access to the file system or make dramatic changes to the device.

=== Alternate operating systems, Android variants and more ===
While Nook is a variant of Android (runs the same programs) with a different user interface and bundled software, a more standard variant of Android (CyanogenMod) is available for the Nook and the smartphone/tablet version of Ubuntu operating system to run applications incompatible with Android.

On February 1, 2014, official CyanogenMod 10.2.1 ("Android 4.3 Jelly Bean") was released for the Nook HD and HD+. CyanogenMod versions for Nook HD and Nook HD+ are released for download under the hummingbird and ovation codenames respectively. CyanogenMod releases monthly M-builds ("rolling release") and no versions marked "stable" are to be expected after version 11.0 M6 Release ("Android 4.4.2 KitKat"). The latest version (4.4.4) is available for the Nook HD/Nook HD+ as a "SNAPSHOT" and "NIGHTLIES" versions.

Since August 2013, a developer preview of Ubuntu Touch 13.10 is also available based on the above ovation. Ubuntu Touch can be installed along with Android, allowing dual booting.

== File transfer ==
Transferring a user's files to another computer is possible, provided that the files are not copy restricted by DRM, using the Media Transfer Protocol (MTP) in supported operating systems.

== See also ==
- Comparison of:
  - E-book readers
  - Tablet computers
