= List of Macintosh software published by Microsoft =

This is a list of Apple Macintosh software published by Microsoft. Prior to 1994, Microsoft had an extensive range of actively developed Macintosh software. In 1994, Microsoft stopped development of most of its Mac applications until a new version of Office in 1998, after the creation of the new Microsoft Macintosh Business Unit the year prior.

== Pre-Microsoft Macintosh Business Unit (1984-1998) ==
- Microsoft BASIC Version 1.0 - Version 3.0 (1984–1986)
- Microsoft Budget
- Microsoft Cash Budget
- Microsoft Chart
- Microsoft File
- Microsoft Multiplan (1984)
- Microsoft Logo (1985)
- Microsoft Excel Version 1.0 (1985), 1.5 (1988), 2.2 (1989), 3.0 (1990), 4.0 (1992), 5.0 (1993)
- Microsoft Word Version 1.0 (1985), 3.0 (1987), 4.0 (1989), 5.x (1991), 6.0 (1993)
- Microsoft Write 1.0 (1987)
- Microsoft Works Versions 1.0 to 4.0 (1986–1994)
- Microsoft Flight Simulator Version 1.0 (1986), 4.0 (1991)
- Microsoft PowerPoint Version 1.0 (1987), 2.0 (1988), 3.0 (1992), 4.0 (1994)
- QuickBASIC Version 1.0 (1988)
- Microsoft Office Version 1.0 (1989)
- Microsoft Project Versions 1.0 to 4.0 (1991–1993)
- Microsoft Art Gallery (1993)
- Microsoft Dinosaurs (1993)
- The Ultimate Haunted House (1993)
- Microsoft FoxPro 2 Version 2.6 (1994)
- Microsoft Bookshelf Version 4.0 (1994)
- Ghostwriter Mysteries for Creative Writer: The Case of the Blue Makva (1994)
- Microsoft Cinemania Version '94, '95, '96, '97 (1994–1996)
- Microsoft Creative Writer (1994)
- Microsoft Dangerous Creatures (1994)
- Microsoft Fine Artist (1994)
- Microsoft Musical Instruments (1994)
- Microsoft Arcade (1995)
- Microsoft Dogs (1995)
- Microsoft Encarta Version '95 (1995), 97 (1996)
- The Magic School Bus (video game series) (1995)
  - Explores Bugs
  - Explores in the Age of the Dinosaurs
  - Explores inside the Earth
  - Explores the Human Body
  - Explores the Ocean
  - Explores the Rainforest
  - Explores the Solar System
- Microsoft Visual C++ Pro Cross Development for Mac 4.0 (1995)
- Microsoft Wine Guide (1995)
- Internet Explorer for Mac Versions 2.0-5.2.3 (1996–2003)
- Microsoft Music Central 96 (1996)
- Microsoft Music Central 97 (1996)
- Microsoft Visual FoxPro Version 3.0 (1996)

== Post Microsoft Macintosh Business Unit (1997-Present) ==
Software in this list is not necessarily written by Macintosh Business Unit, however was/is published by Microsoft Corp.

- Internet Explorer for Mac 96-05
- Age of Empires
- Microsoft Edge (2019)
- Microsoft FrontPage (1998)
- Microsoft Outlook (1998–2001) 14 (2010), 16 (2018)
- Microsoft Excel Version 8.0 (1998), 9.0 (2000), 10 (2001), 11 (2004), 12 (2008), 14 (2010), 16 (2018)
- Microsoft PowerPoint Version 8.0 (1998), 9.0 (2000), 10.0 (2002), 11.0 (2004), 12.0 (2008), 14 (2010), 16 (2018)
- Microsoft Word Version 8.0 (1998), 9.0 (2000), 10 (2001), 11 (2004), 12 (2008) 14 (2010), 16 (2018)
- Microsoft Entourage (2001–2008)
- Windows Media Player Version 6.3 (2000), 7.0.1 (2001), 7.1 (2002), 9.0 (2003)
- Microsoft Silverlight
- Microsoft Visual Studio (2017), (2019)
- Microsoft Visual Studio Code (2015)
- Microsoft Virtual PC (2004-6)
- Phase One Media Pro (2010) (formerly Microsoft Expression Media and iView Media Pro)
- Microsoft Windows Phone 7 Connector (Version 1, 2), Microsoft Windows Phone for Mac 3.0
- Skype since its acquisition by Microsoft in (2011 - 2025)
