= Microsoft Home =

Defunct line of products by Microsoft

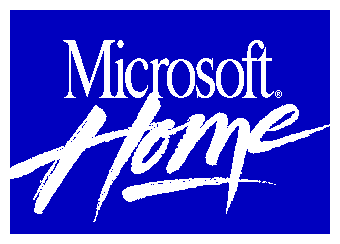
- Developer: Microsoft
- Release: 1993; 33 years ago
- Operating system: Microsoft Windows
- Available in: English
- Type: Various
- License: Proprietary

Microsoft Home is a discontinued line of software applications and personal hardware products published by Microsoft. The Microsoft Home brand was first announced by Bill Gates in a presentation on October 4, 1993. These applications were designed to bring multimedia to Microsoft Windows and Macintosh personal computers. With more than 60 products available under the Microsoft Home brand by 1994, the company's push into the consumer market took off. Microsoft Plus!, an add-on enhancement package for Windows, continued until the Windows XP era. The range of home software catered for many different consumer interests from gaming with Microsoft Arcade and Entertainment Packs to reference titles such as Microsoft Encarta, Bookshelf and Cinemania. Shortly after the release of Microsoft Windows 95, the company began to reduce the price of Microsoft Home products and by the rise of the World Wide Web by 1998, Microsoft began to phase out the line of software.

== Titles ==
Microsoft Home produced software for all different home uses and environments. The products are divided into five categories: Reference & Exploration, Entertainment, Kids, Home Productivity and Sounds, and Sights & Gear. The category in which the product was divided is identifiable by the packaging. Generally, Reference & Exploration products have a purple base color, Entertainment has a black base color, Kids has a yellow base color, Home Productivity has a green color and Sounds, Sights & Gear products have a grey or red base color. Note that many applications were developed in conjunction with other software and reference companies. For example, Microsoft Musical Instruments was developed with Dorling Kindersley.

=== Reference and exploration software ===
Microsoft Home Reference products brought information to Multimedia Personal Computers - it was an effective way of presenting and exploring information before the World Wide Web became mainstream. These products were embellished with hyperlink relatively new at this time. Most of these products were released on CD-ROM, giving the software the ability to display high-resolution graphics and animations, and play high-quality waveforms and MIDI files. These products proved that personal computers would revolutionize the way that we find and explore information.

Name	Year of Release	Retail Price when New
Microsoft Encarta	1993–2009	US$99.95/CAD$139.95
Microsoft Encarta Africana	1999-2001 (Later merged into Encarta)	
Microsoft Bookshelf	1987, 1992, 1994-2000	US$69.95/CAD$99.95
Microsoft Cinemania	1994-1997	US$59.95/CAD$79.95
Microsoft Automap Streets, Streets Plus (then Expedia Streets & Microsoft Streets & Trips)	1995-2013	
Microsoft Automap Road Atlas (then Expedia Trip Planner & Microsoft Streets & Trips)	1995-2013	
Microsoft AutoRoute Express (then Microsoft AutoRoute)	1995-2013	
Microsoft Music Central	1996-1997	
Microsoft Complete Baseball	1994-1995	US$49.95/CAD$69.95
Microsoft Complete NBA Basketball	1994-1996	US$49.95/CAD$69.95
Microsoft Complete Gardening	1996	
Microsoft Reader's Digest Complete Do-It-Yourself Guide	1996	
Microsoft Oceans	1995	
Microsoft 500 Nations (North American Indian tribes and civilizations)	1995	
Microsoft World of Flight	1995	
Microsoft Ancient Lands	1994	US$59.95/CAD$79.95
Microsoft Dinosaurs	1993	US$59.95/CAD$79.95
Microsoft Dangerous Creatures	1994	US$59.95/CAD$79.95
Microsoft Dogs	1995	
Microsoft Musical Instruments	1992	US$59.95/CAD$79.95
Microsoft Isaac Asimov's The Ultimate Robot	1993	US$59.95/CAD$79.95
Microsoft Art Gallery	1994	US$59.95/CAD$79.95
Microsoft Wine Guide	1995	
Microsoft Julia Child: Home Cooking with Master Chefs	1995	
Microsoft The Ultimate Frank Lloyd Wright: America's Architect	1994	US$59.95/CAD$79.95
Microsoft Composer Collection	1995	US$79.95/CAD$109.95
Microsoft Multimedia Mozart: The Dissonant Quartet	1992–1995	US$59.95/CAD$79.95
Microsoft Multimedia Beethoven: The Ninth Symphony	1992–1995	US$59.95/CAD$79.95
Microsoft Multimedia Schubert: The Trout Quintet	1992–1995	US$59.95/CAD$79.95
Microsoft Multimedia Stravinsky: The Rite of Spring	1992–1995	US$59.95/CAD$79.95
Microsoft Multimedia Strauss: Three Tone Poems	1992–1995	US$59.95/CAD$79.95

=== Entertainment ===
In the early 1990s, games on personal computers generally ran on the now obsolete MS-DOS operating system. However, with the introduction of Microsoft Windows 3.1x in 1992, Microsoft Home published several entertainment applications that implemented the new technologies of Microsoft Windows such as DirectX. Furthermore, these applications encouraged the computer gamers of the time to migrate from MS-DOS to Microsoft Windows. This transition permitted better use of computer graphics, revolutionized game programming and resulted in a more realistic gaming experience, compared to DOS gaming. For example, Microsoft Windows Entertainment Pack Games have remained a classic for computer gamers, ever since their development in the early 1990s.

Name	Year of Release	Retail Price when New
Microsoft Fury3	1995	
Microsoft Hellbender (Sequel of Fury3)	1996	
Microsoft Deadly Tide (underwater fighting machines)	1996	
Microsoft Flight Simulator	1982, 1993-2006	US$49.95/CAD$64.95
Scenery Enhancements for Microsoft Flight Simulator Version 5.0: Microsoft Caribbean; Microsoft Hawaii; Microsoft Japan; Microsoft Paris; Microsoft New York	1995	US$34.95/CAD$49.95
Microsoft Golf	1993-2001	US$49.95/CAD$69.95
Microsoft Golf Championship Courses: Mauna Kea Championship Course; Banff Springs Championship Course; Pinehurst Championship Course	1993	US$24.95/CAD$34.95
Microsoft Space Simulator	1995	US$49.95/CAD$64.95
Best of Microsoft Entertainment Pack	1995	US$24.95/CAD$34.95
Microsoft Arcade	1993	US$34.95/CAD$44.95
Microsoft Return of Arcade	1996	
Microsoft Revenge of Arcade	1998	
Microsoft Pinball Arcade	1998	

=== Kids ===
Microsoft Kids logo

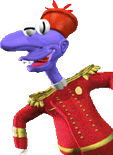
The purple cartoon character McZee was used as a mascot for the Microsoft Kids line.

The Microsoft Kids division produced educational software aimed at children in 1993. Their products feature a purple-skinned character named McZee who wears wacky attire and leads children through the fictional town of Imaginopolis, where each building or room is a unique interface to a different part of the software. He is accompanied by a different partner in each software title.

Tying in with the TV series, Microsoft Scholastic's The Magic School Bus was a highly successful series that continued to be sold after Microsoft Home's range of children's software turned into a subsidiary called Microsoft Kids.

Name	Year of Release	Retail Price when New
Microsoft Scholastic's The Magic School Bus: (This was a series of software based on the television series of the same name. The user had to solve puzzles based on science in order to complete the game.): Explores Bugs; Explores in the Age of the Dinosaurs; Explores Inside the Earth; Explores the Human Body; Explores the Ocean; Explores the Rainforest; Explores the Solar System; Explores the World of Animals	1994-2000	US$49.95/CAD$69.95
Microsoft Gahan Wilson's The Ultimate Haunted House (A game designed by Gahan Wilson designed for children to explore an eerie Haunted House populated by strange inhabitants.)	1993	US$49.95/CAD$69.95
Microsoft Creative Writer and Creative Writer 2 (Word processors released in 1994 and 1996 respectively aimed specifically at children).	1993	US$49.95/CAD$69.95
Microsoft Fine Artist (Drawing program that looked and felt similar to Creative Writer.)	1993	US$49.95/CAD$69.95
Ghostwriter Mysteries for Creative Writer	1995	US$19.95/CAD$29.95
P.J.'s Reading Adventures (Collection of three storybook adventures for children, Paul Bunyan, How the Leopard Got His Spots and Koi and the Kola Nuts.)	1995	US$49.95/CAD$69.95
Microsoft 3D Movie Maker (Children-oriented program that allowed them to create their own movies using preset character animation and sounds)	1995	US$49.95/CAD$69.95
Microsoft Nickelodeon 3D Movie Maker (Used characters from the popular Nickelodeon animated series)	1996	US$49.95/CAD$69.95
Microsoft Explorapedia: (These were two interactive children-oriented encyclopedias. It contained 400 articles accessed by clicking the appropriate picture in the environment.): The World of People; The World of Nature	1995	US$49.95/CAD$69.95
Microsoft Plus! for Kids (Windows 95 Plus Pack for Kids)	1995	US$24.95
My Personal Tutor (Software-instructed learning for preschool to first grade)	1997	US$54.95
ActiMates Toy characters and software titles based on Barney & Friends, Arthur, and Teletubbies	1997	US$64.95 for TV Pack and PC Pack, US$34.95 for software titles.

=== Home productivity software ===
Name	Year of Release	Retail Price when New
Microsoft BOB	1995	US$99.00
Microsoft Great Greetings for Microsoft BOB	1995	
Microsoft Bob Plus Pack	1995	
Microsoft Money	1994-2008	US$14.95/CAD$24.95
Microsoft Publisher (Now part of Microsoft Office)	1993–2026	US$99.95/CAD$139.95
Microsoft Publisher Design Packs: Microsoft Publisher StyleLine Design Pack; Microsoft Publisher Design Pack; Microsoft Publisher Special Occasions Design Pack	1993	US$39.95/CAD$54.95
Microsoft Greetings Workshop	1996-2002	
Microsoft Picture It! (rebranded as Microsoft Digital Image)	1996	
Microsoft Home Publishing	1999-2000	
Microsoft Works 3.0 for Windows	1994	US$99.95/CAD$139.95
Microsoft Works 3.0 for Windows on CD	1994	US$99.95/CAD$139.95
Microsoft Works 4.0 for Macintosh		US$99.95/CAD$139.95
Microsoft Works and Bookshelf '94	1994	US$99.95/CAD$139.95

=== Sights, Sounds & Gear ===
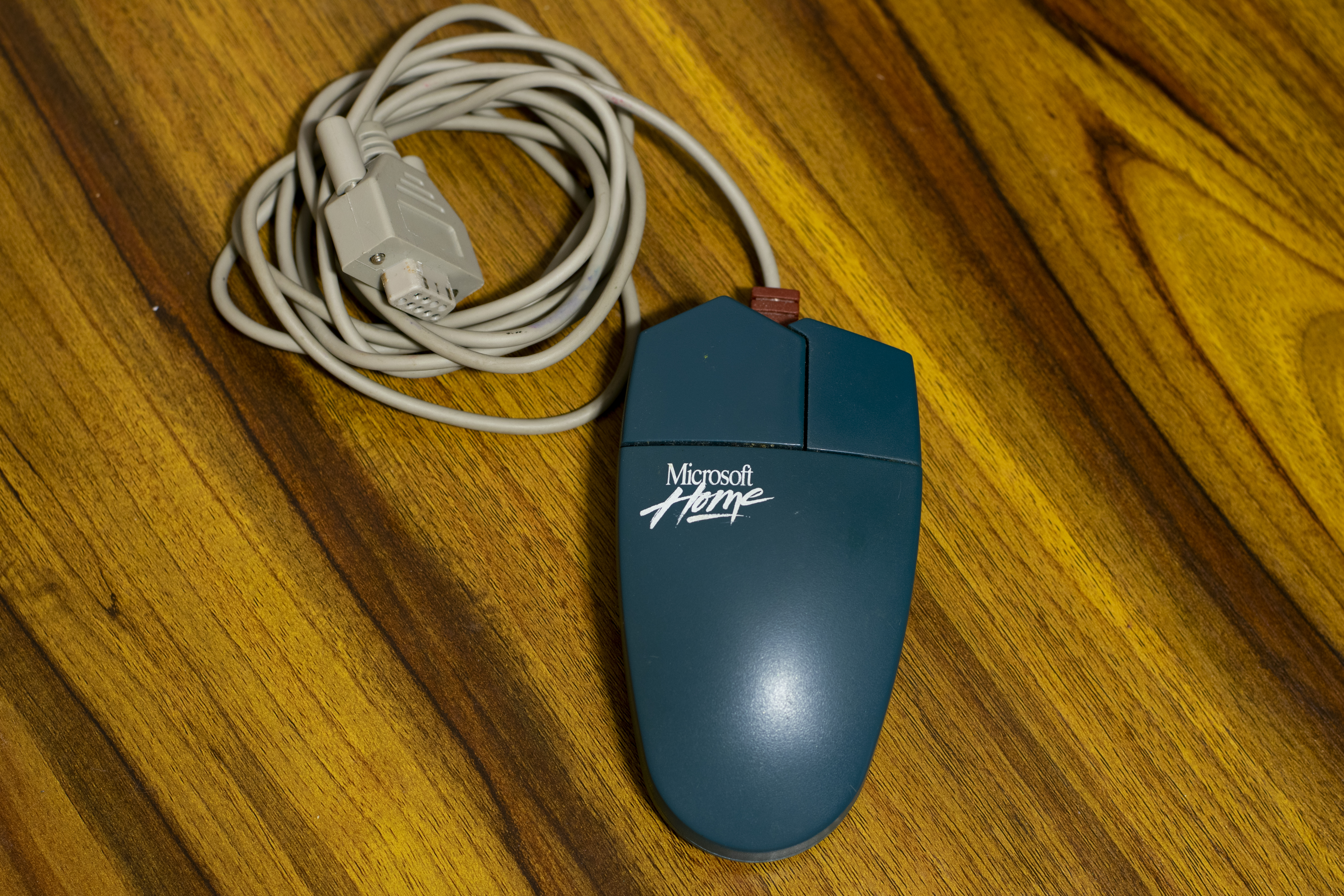
Microsoft Home Mouse

Name	Year of Release	Retail Price when New
Microsoft Scenes screensaver and wallpaper program: Sierra Club Wildlife Collection; Sierra Club Nature Collection; Undersea Collection; Sports Extremes Collection; Personal Collection; Outer Space Collection; Flight Collection; Hollywood Collection; Brain Twister Collection; Stereogram Collection; Impressionist Collection	1994	US$24.95/CAD$34.95
Microsoft Natural Keyboard	1994	US$99.95/CAD$129.95
Microsoft Mouse	1993	US$64.95/CAD$84.95
Microsoft Windows Sound System Version 2.0	1995	US$59.95/CAD$84.95
Microsoft Home Mouse	1995	US$44.95/CAD$59.95
Microsoft SoundBits (sound schemes): Microsoft SoundBits - Hanna-Barbera; Microsoft SoundBits - Hollywood; Microsoft SoundBits - Musical Instruments	1992–1994	US$24.95/CAD$34.95

== Legacy ==
=== Current products ===
- Microsoft Publisher is still available even today as a part of Microsoft Office, although it is in maintenance phase, there have been no feature enhancements for years after Publisher 2010. It is planned to discontinue in October of 2026
- Microsoft Flight Simulator development was discontinued with the closure of ACES Game Studio. A replacement, Microsoft Flight, was later developed but subsequently also discontinued. However, the last version of the original software was later made available via Steam. In 2020, a brand-new Flight Simulator version was released with updated DirectX graphics technology.
- Microsoft Picture It! eventually became Microsoft Digital Image and was discontinued after the release of Windows Vista. Windows Photo Gallery, itself later discontinued, and its successor Photos include similar features.

=== Discontinued products ===
- Microsoft AutoMap later became Microsoft MapPoint and Microsoft Streets & Trips. This can be confirmed by "AutoMap" registry entries installed by these products. Both were discontinued in 2014.
- Microsoft Works was replaced by Office Starter 2010 which is available to OEMs for installation on new PCs only and does not include a replacement for the Works Database program. Office Starter 2010 was discontinued before Office 2013 was released, replaced by Office Online.
- Microsoft Encarta and Microsoft Money were discontinued in 2009, and no replacement products have been announced or released.
