= Outline of Microsoft =

Overview of and topical guide to Microsoft

Microsoft Corporation is a multinational corporation based in Redmond, Washington, USA and founded by Bill Gates and Paul Allen that develops, manufactures, licenses, and supports a wide range of products and services predominantly related to computing. Due to the scope and size of the company, it encompasses a broad range of topics mostly revolving around critical analysis and the company's products and services.

== Lists ==
- List of mergers and acquisitions by Microsoft
- List of Control Panel applets (Windows)
- List of Games for Windows titles
- List of Macintosh software published by Microsoft
- List of Microsoft - Nortel (ICA) products
- List of Microsoft codenames
- List of Microsoft DOS versions
  - List of DOS commands
- List of Microsoft Office programs
- List of Microsoft operating systems
- List of Microsoft software
- List of Microsoft server technology
- List of Microsoft Visual Studio add-ins
- List of Microsoft Windows components
- List of Microsoft Windows application programming interfaces and frameworks
- List of typefaces included with Microsoft Windows
- List of Microsoft Windows versions

== Analysis ==
- Criticism of Microsoft
- Microsoft litigation
- Microsoft interview

== Networking ==
- NetBEUI
- APIPA
- Internet Information Services

== Events ==
- Build
- MIX
- PDC
- TechEd
- WinHEC

== Devices ==
- Actimates − Set of toys (discontinued) developed by Microsoft.
- Pocket PC
- Microsoft Mouse
- Microsoft Natural keyboard
- Xbox
  - Xbox
  - Xbox 360
  - Xbox One
  - Xbox Series X/S
- Kinect
  - Azure Kinect
- UMPC
- SideWinder family
- Digital Sound System 80
- Microsoft Zune
- Microsoft Surface
  - Surface Go line of hybrid tablets, with optional detachable keyboard accessories and optional digital pen.
  - Surface Pro line of hybrid tablets, with similar, optional detachable keyboard accessories and optional digital pen.
  - Surface Laptop Go, marketed as a more affordable alternative to the brand's premium laptops.
  - Surface Laptop, a classic notebook with a 13.5-inch or 15-inch touchscreen aimed at students.
  - Surface Book, a notebook with a detachable tablet screen. Some variants of the base include discrete graphics.
  - Surface Laptop Studio, a notebook with dual-pivoting screen to change into tablet mode.
  - Surface Studio, a 28-inch all-in-one desktop that adjusts into a digital drafting table with stylus and on-screen Surface Dial support.
  - Surface Hub, a touch screen interactive whiteboard designed for collaboration.
  - Surface Laptop SE, an entry-level laptop targeted at the education market, designed to be easier to repair by service partners for on-site repair.
  - Surface Duo, a dual-screen foldable Android phone.

== Partnerships ==
- Virus Information Alliance – An international partnership created by the Microsoft Corporation in association with various antivirus vendors.
- Ultra Mobile PC − Joint specification by Microsoft and others for a small form factor tablet PC.
- Microsoft Partner Network - The Microsoft partner companies who build solutions on top of Microsoft software or who resell Microsoft software.

== People ==
=== Board of directors ===
- John W. Thompson (chairperson)
- Satya Nadella (CEO)
- Dina Dublon
- Raymond Gilmartin
- Maria Klawe
- David Marquardt
- Charles Noski
- Helmut Panke

=== Chief officers ===
- Satya Nadella (CEO)
- Amy Hood (CFO)
- Craig Mundie (CRSO)
- Kevin Turner (COO)

=== Senior Leaders ===
- Tony Bates
- Julie Larson-Green
- Qi Lu
- Terry Myerson
- Satya Nadella
- Mark Penn
- Tami Reller

=== Presidents and VPs ===
- Joe Belfiore
- Jon DeVaan (SVP)
- Richard Rashid (SVP)
- S. Somasegar (SVP)

== Segments and subsidiaries ==
- Microsoft Services Asia − A subsidiary responsible for services across Asia.
- Microsoft Studios − A division responsible for the creation of video content for Microsoft and its partners.
- Microsoft Research - A division responsible for the research of computer science.
- MSNBC - A television station formerly co-owned by Microsoft; Microsoft is still a shareholder.
- Slate - Current affairs magazine created by Microsoft and later sold to the Washington Post Company.
- Microsoft Skype Division - A Division responsible for the Skype and Microsoft Lync products
- Microsoft hardware

== Other ==
- Bliss (image)
- Microsoft and open source
- Shared Source Initiative
