= Microsoft hardware =

Overview of hardware branded by Microsoft

Microsoft Corporation has been selling branded hardware since 1980, and developing devices in-house since 1982, when the Microsoft Hardware division was formed to design a computer mouse for use with Microsoft Word for DOS. Since then, Microsoft has developed computer hardware, gaming hardware and mobile hardware. It also produced drivers and other software for integrating the hardware with Microsoft Windows.

In April 2023, Microsoft announced that it would discontinue the production of most branded PC accessories, electing to focus solely on Microsoft Surface-branded products (which are aimed at a high-end market). In January 2024, Microsoft announced an agreement with Incase, under which it would license designs for a number of its existing hardware products (including its mice, keyboards, and webcam designs), and provide it with access to its existing supply chains. These products will be marketed under the Incase branding moving forward, but will carry a "designed by Microsoft" tagline.

== Products ==
Microsoft Hardware and Accessories
Category	Product Name
Augmented Reality
Augmented Reality	Integrated Visual Augmentation System
Augmented Reality	Microsoft HoloLens smartglasses
Biometric Security
Biometric Security	Microsoft Fingerprint Reader
Computer Accessories
Computer Mice	Arc Mouse
Computer Mice	IntelliMouse
Computer Mice	Microsoft Mouse
Keyboards	Microsoft Keyboard
Webcams	LifeCam
Headsets	LifeChat
Speakers	Digital Sound System 80
Development & Interactive Displays
Development Kit	Windows Dev Kit 2023
Interactive Displays	PixelSense
Interactive Displays	Surface Hub
Interactive Display Technology	TouchLight
Gaming
Game Controllers	Microsoft SideWinder
Game Controllers	Xbox game controllers
Gaming Accessories	Xbox accessories
Video Game Consoles	Xbox video game consoles
Hardware & Accelerators
Hardware Accelerator	Microsoft Mach 20 accelerator board
Hardware Accelerator	Z-80 SoftCard coprocessor card
Mobile & Telecommunication
Mobile Phones	Microsoft Kin mobile phones
Mobile Phones	Microsoft Lumia smartphones
Mobile Phones	Nokia 3-digit series feature phones
Mobile Phones	Nokia Asha series
Telecommunication	Microsoft Cordless Phone System phones
Telecommunication	Microsoft Response Point business telephone systems
Networking & Wireless
Networking	Microsoft Broadband Networking networking products
Wireless Display	Microsoft wireless display adapters
Portable Media & Internet Appliances
Internet Appliances	MSN Companion
Portable Media Players	Zune
Personal computers
All-in-one PCs, Tablet PCs	Microsoft Surface
Wearables
Wearable Technology	Microsoft Band, Microsoft Band 2
Other
Interactive Toys	ActiMates
Developer kit	Azure Kinect
Unknown	Jazz
Unknown	Project Sidekick
Macintosh Accessories	Microsoft MacEnhancer

== See also ==
- List of Microsoft software
- Computer hardware
- Outline of Microsoft
