= 3D Movie Maker =

Movie making program by Microsoft

Microsoft 3D Movie Maker
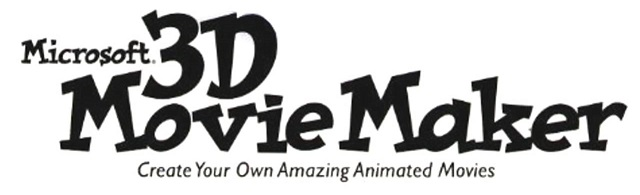

- Developers: Microsoft Kids; Big Blue Dot (Nickelodeon 3D Movie Maker)
- Release: 1995; 31 years ago
- Final release: ? / October 9, 1995; 31 years ago
- Written in: C++
- Engine: BRender
- Operating system: Microsoft Windows
- Available in: English; French; German; Italian; Japanese; Russian; Spanish
- Type: 3D computer graphics software
- License: MIT License (formerly Proprietary)
- Repository: github.com/microsoft/Microsoft-3D-Movie-Maker

3D Movie Maker (commonly shortened to 3DMM) is a discontinued children's computer program developed by Microsoft Home's Microsoft Kids subsidiary released in 1995. Using the program, users can make films by placing 3D characters and props into pre-rendered environments, as well as adding actions, sound effects, music, text, speech and special effects. Movies are then saved in the .3mm file format.

The program features two helper characters to guide users through the various features of the program: The character McZee (voiced by Michael Shapiro), shared from other Microsoft Kids products like Creative Writer, provides help throughout the studio while his assistant Melanie provides other various tutorials. In Nickelodeon 3D Movie Maker, the user is instead guided by Stick Stickly.

Developed in accordance with Microsoft's broader ambitions towards multimedia software in conjunction with the release of its then-new Windows 95 home computer operating system, 3D Movie Maker is built on BRender, a software rasterized 3D graphics engine created by Argonaut Software. The models and backgrounds were made by Illumin8 Digital Pictures (a now-defunct graphics studio) using Softimage modeling software, while the cinematic introduction and help sequences were made by Productions Jarnigoine, a now-inactive production company founded by Jean-Jacques Tremblay. In 1998, a user named Space Goat created the website 3dmm.com that allows users to upload movies and mods for 3DMM. 3dmm.com is still used as of 2025 by many 3DMM enthusiasts.

Following the open-sourcing of the licensed BRender engine prior in similar fashion, Microsoft released the source code of the program under the MIT License in May 2022, following a request by Alice Averlong on Twitter a month earlier.

== Overview ==
Filmmaking in 3D Movie Maker is a straightforward process, allowing users to create various kinds of movies with ease. By default, 40 actors/actresses are available (each with 4 different costumes and a number of actions), as well as 20 different props. Twelve different scenes are available to the user, each containing several different static camera angles. While the actors and props are rendered as polygonal meshes with affine texture mapping and basic shading, the scene backgrounds instead are pre-rendered images with an associated depth buffer that is compared against the runtime-rendered meshes so that aspects of the scene at hand can appear to occlude the meshes once a character or prop is placed behind a static object from the background. Many sample voice and MIDI music clips are included, but original voices can be recorded using a microphone while external .wav and .MIDI files can be imported.

In 3DMM, movies are recorded from frames in quick succession, featuring a destructive editing paradigm. Whilst pre-created animations (such as walking or dancing) can be applied to actors and made to run over a number of frames in sequence, unlike conventional animation software, the interface explicitly does not expose any distinction between abstract keyframes and inbetweens. 3DMM stores the positions of the characters and objects for each frame. Lending itself to the hardware limitations of the time when computers with performant 3D graphics rendering were more out-of-reach for most families, the game's internal movie playback frame rate was capped to 6-8 frames per second, depending on the system.

A finished movie can only be viewed inside 3DMM using the virtual auditorium or the studio, unless converted to a video file format with a third-party utility. The application's user interface is centered upon a theater building consisting of several rooms: the ticket booth, where the user is greeted by McZee and then asked to play or create a movie; the lobby and concession stand; the theater for watching movies, a projecting room for tutorials for 3D logos and tips, an idea room for movie ideas (also where the talent book stands); and the studio for movie-making tools. The V3DMM version of 3DMM removes the surrounding diegetic theater interface and thus restricts viewing movies only in the studio.

The two common file formats used by 3D Movies are .3mm and .vmm. .nmm was a third file format once used by 3D Movies, but since the release of the "Nickelodeon 3DMM" add-on to 3D Movie Maker, which combined both editions in one program, this has been deprecated by the ".3mm" file format.

The Comic Sans font, originally intended to be used for Microsoft Bob, made its first appearance in 3D Movie Maker. Michael Shapiro, the voice actor for McZee, later went on to voice G-Man in the Half-Life series.

== Versions ==
- A Japanese expansion pack for 3DMM was released with characters from the popular children's manga and anime series Doraemon. It consists of 11 new scenes, 5 new characters and 96 new voice lines.
- Nickelodeon 3D Movie Maker is a Nickelodeon-themed version of 3D Movie Maker. This version includes 12 unique actors and 11 unique scenes from Rocko's Modern Life, Ren & Stimpy and Aaahh!!! Real Monsters. An unofficial expansion pack allows Nickelodeon actors, props, scenes, music and sounds to be used in the original 3D Movie Maker.
- Demo versions: These only feature the studio, do not allow the opening/saving of movies and only feature two actors and one prop. They are Bongo, Nakita and a red car for 3D Movie Maker, while for Nickelodeon 3D Movie Maker they are Ren, Stimpy and a spaceship. A demo version was distributed with the Microsoft Interactive CD Sampler (1996).

== Third-party ==
Several user-made expansion packs and animation tools exist, such as:

- 3DMM Animation Pro (2002): Binds mouse movements to the keyboard, which allows directors to create more fluid movements on the screen.
- Doraemon Expansion Pack: This pack was only released in Japan.
- 3DMM Expansion Pack (2003): A user-made expansion pack known as "Frankie's Expansion" after its creator Frank Weindel, who introduced the first new textures, actors and objects to the software since release.
- Virtual 3D Movie Maker (V3DMM; 2004): An unofficial third-party expansion management program that allows users to include their own customized expansions in their movies and allow them to be freely distributed. Notable expansions include characters from The Simpsons, Pokémon, PaRappa the Rapper, and other notable media icons.
- 7gen (2005): A GUI for creating V3DMM expansions.
- 3DMM Pencil++ 2: A program for editing 3D Movie Maker datafiles that allows users to edit expansions.
- Nickelodeon Expansion Pack: An unofficial expansion pack that adds all the actors, props, textures, scenes and sounds from Nickelodeon 3D Movie Maker.

== Reception ==
Alamo PC Organization wrote: "This is not a program one masters in a few days, or even weeks. It is a wonderful demonstration of technological advancement for Windows 95 graphical programming possibilities. This program in the hands of casual, perhaps even dedicated home users, is not a threat to any commercial animation firm." Aaron Matterson of Joystick Division said that "it looked impossibly goofy even by 1995 standards, but [I did] love it, and it taught me many things about my own creativity, the art of storytelling, and a strange, terrible humanoid creature named McZee".

CNET said, "Still, it's encouraging to see what kids can do--and want to spend time doing--with 3D Movie Maker. It ain't a master class from Scorsese, but it's better than a repeat viewing of Ace Ventura."

== See also ==
- Hollywood High
- Kahootz
- The Movies
- Theatrix's Hollywood
- Windows Movie Maker
- Moviestorm
- Garry's Mod
- Source Filmmaker
- Mario Artist: Talent Studio
- MikuMikuDance
- Fine Artist
