= List of Microsoft server technologies =

The following is a list of Microsoft server technology.

== Backup ==
- Data Protection Manager (Beta product)

== Administration ==
- Terminal Services
- Active Directory (AD)
- Primary Domain Controller (PDC)
- Domain Controller
- Windows Server domain
- Windows Internet Naming Service (WINS)
- Remote Desktop Protocol (RDP)
- Systems Management Server

== Internet services ==
- Active Server Pages (ASP)
- Application Center Test (ACT)
- ASP.NET
- Internet Information Services (IIS)
- Microsoft Exchange Server
- Microsoft Forefront Threat Management Gateway (Forefront TMG)
- Microsoft Project Server
- Office Web Apps Server
- SharePoint
- Skype for Business Server

== Cloud and Hybrid ==
- Azure Arc
- Azure Stack
- Windows Admin Center

== Databases ==
- Microsoft SQL Server
- Microsoft Desktop Engine

== Developer Services ==
- Team Foundation Server
- Visual Studio Team Services

== Virtualization ==
- Hyper-V

== See also ==
- List of Microsoft topics
