= 3D Movie =

3D Movie may refer to:

- A 3-D film, a type of film projected to create the illusion of depth
- 3D Movie (software), computer file for a software product by Microsoft
