= The Motion Picture Guide =

The Motion Picture Guide is a film reference work first published by Cinebooks in 1985. It was written by Jay Robert Nash, Stanley Ralph Ross, and Robert B. Connelly. It was updated annually with new volumes and included a CD-ROM version, which was eventually incorporated into Microsoft Cinemania.

== Publication history ==
The Motion Picture Guide was first published in 1985 through Cinebooks. From 1992 through 1997, it was also published in CD-ROM format. This data was later incorporated into Microsoft Cinemania. The Motion Picture Guide series was discontinued after the 1999 Annual edition.

== Reception ==
The American Library Association cited it as an Outstanding Reference Source for 1985. Writing in the Los Angeles Times, Charles Champlin called the 1986 edition "the film fan reference book to end all reference books". Dan Greenberg, in Film Quarterly, criticized the 1987 volume's positive reviews, saying that reviewers had overlooked poor research and errors in favor of its marketing, which highlighted its scope. Howard H. Prouty, in the Journal of Film and Video, wrote that the 1987 edition fails to live up to its hype as an authoritative source, instead synthesizing data from common secondary sources and ending up with contradictory information.

Emma Webster of Variety called the 1995 CD-ROM version "a valuable tool for film buffs, students and industry people", criticizing its lack of comprehensiveness but praising its depth. Also reviewing the 1995 CD-ROM, Peter M. Nichols of The New York Times highlighted its depth compared to competing discs from Blockbuster and Video Hound. However, he said it lacks their features.
