= Theatrix =

Theatrix may refer to:

- Theatrix (role-playing game), a diceless role-playing game
- Theatrix Interactive, an educational software company

== See also ==
- Theatrics
