= Windows Maps =

Web mapping software by Microsoft

- Windows Maps screenshot on Windows 11 (2022 map)
- Developer: Microsoft
- Release: 20 November 2014; 11 years ago
- Final release: June 2025 Update (11.2506.3.0) / 8 July 2025; 15 months ago
- Operating system: Windows 10, 11; Xbox One system software, Xbox Series X/S; Windows 8, Windows Phone 7 to Windows 10 Mobile
- Successor: Bing Maps
- Type: Web mapping
- License: Proprietary freeware
- Website: support.microsoft.com/en-us/windows/find-your-way-with-maps-51ece9fb-a0f2-9853-4164-6940865085c8

Windows Maps is a discontinued web mapping client software from Microsoft. It is included with Windows 10 and Windows 11 operating systems and is also available for the Xbox Series X/S and Xbox One platforms.

== Features ==
Its features include viewing classic style maps with roads and street names, getting directions, drawing on maps, traffic conditions, GPS location, and viewing Streetside panoramas of roads. Users can synchronise favourites and directions with a Microsoft account. Maps of countries can be downloaded to the user's computer so that they can be used offline.

== History ==
The original Maps app was based on existing Microsoft technologies such as Microsoft MapPoint and TerraServer that were already used in Bing Maps. It was first implemented on Windows Phone 7 as a Metro-style app using Bing Maps as its backend. In 2012 Maps came included with Windows 8 as one of the many Bing Apps. The app was updated with new features in Windows Phone 8.1 where the Maps app took on a Purple paper map-looking logo. Bing Maps at the time was powered by Nokia's data, which later became HERE Maps.

Windows Maps on Windows 10 Mobile then changed the layout of the Maps app, including the logo. Since coming out of preview, there has been three different layout changes, including the introduction of tabs, the ability for users to sketch using ink, a switch for choosing between a light and dark interface for the app shell, and a switch for choosing between a light and dark map.

After HERE Maps announced it was discontinuing its Windows 10 Mobile app in 2016, Windows Maps announced support for migrating up to 300 favorites from HERE Maps to Windows Maps.

In 2016, Windows Maps was released for Xbox One.

Since 2020, the base map data in Windows Maps and Bing Maps has been provided by TomTom, having replaced Here Technologies.

On April 25, 2025, Microsoft announced that the Windows Maps was reached end of support and is "non-functional" on June 25, 2025. Windows Maps was removed from the Microsoft Store on July 1, 2025, and is no longer receiving future updates, replaced by Bing Maps.

== Coverage ==
=== Americas ===
Country	Navteq coverage	Bird's eye	Map POIs
United States	Full	Yes	Yes
Bahamas	Full	No	Yes
Canada	Full	Yes	Yes
Cayman Islands	Full	No	Yes
Mexico	Full	No	Yes
Puerto Rico	Full	No	Yes
Virgin Islands	Full	No	Yes
Argentina	Full	No	Yes
Brazil	Full	No	Yes
Chile	Full	No	Yes
Colombia	Full	No	Named Places & Transportation Hubs
French Guiana	Full	No	No
Guadeloupe	Full	No	No
Martinique	Full	No	No
Saint Barthelemy	Full	No	No
Venezuela	Full	No	Yes
Anguilla	Limited	No	Named Places & Transportation Hubs
Antigua and Barbuda	Limited	No	Named Places & Transportation Hubs
Aruba	Limited	No	Named Places & Transportation Hubs
Barbados	Limited	No	Named Places & Transportation Hubs
Belize	Limited	No	Named Places & Transportation Hubs
Bermuda	Limited	No	Named Places & Transportation Hubs
Bolivia	Limited	No	Named Places & Transportation Hubs
Costa Rica	Limited	No	Named Places & Transportation Hubs
Cuba	Limited	No	Named Places & Transportation Hubs
Dominica	Limited	No	Named Places & Transportation Hubs
Dominican Republic	Limited	No	Named Places & Transportation Hubs
Ecuador	Limited	No	Named Places & Transportation Hubs
El Salvador	Limited	No	Named Places & Transportation Hubs
Falkland Islands (Malvinas)	Limited	No	Named Places & Transportation Hubs
Greenland	Limited	No	Named Places & Transportation Hubs
Grenada	Limited	No	Named Places & Transportation Hubs
Guatemala	Limited	No	Named Places & Transportation Hubs
Guyana	Limited	No	Named Places & Transportation Hubs
Haiti	Limited	No	Named Places & Transportation Hubs
Honduras	Limited	No	Named Places & Transportation Hubs
Jamaica	Limited	No	Named Places & Transportation Hubs
Montserrat	Limited	No	Named Places & Transportation Hubs
Netherlands Antilles	Limited	No	Named Places & Transportation Hubs
Nicaragua	Limited	No	Named Places & Transportation Hubs
Panama	Limited	No	Named Places & Transportation Hubs
Paraguay	Limited	No	Named Places & Transportation Hubs
Peru	Limited	No	Named Places & Transportation Hubs
Saint Kitts and Nevis	Limited	No	Named Places & Transportation Hubs
Saint Lucia	Limited	No	Named Places & Transportation Hubs
Saint Vincent and The Grenadines	Limited	No	Named Places & Transportation Hubs
St. Pierre and Miquelon	Limited	No	Named Places & Transportation Hubs
Suriname	Limited	No	Named Places & Transportation Hubs
Trinidad and Tobago	Limited	No	Named Places & Transportation Hubs
Turks and Caicos Islands	Limited	No	Named Places & Transportation Hubs
Uruguay	Limited	No	Named Places & Transportation Hubs

=== Africa ===
Country	Navteq coverage	Bird's eye	Map POIs
Algeria	Limited	No	Named Places & Transportation Hubs
Angola	Limited	No	Named Places & Transportation Hubs
Botswana	Full	No	Yes
Benin	Limited	No	Named Places & Transportation Hubs
Burkina Faso	Limited	No	Named Places & Transportation Hubs
Burundi	Limited	No	Named Places & Transportation Hubs
Cameroon	Limited	No	Named Places & Transportation Hubs
Cape Verde	Limited	No	Named Places & Transportation Hubs
Central African Republic	Limited	No	Named Places & Transportation Hubs
Chad	Limited	No	Named Places & Transportation Hubs
Comoros	Limited	No	Named Places & Transportation Hubs
Congo	Limited	No	Named Places & Transportation Hubs
Côte d'Ivoire	Limited	No	Named Places & Transportation Hubs
Djibouti	Limited	No	Named Places & Transportation Hubs
Equatorial Guinea	Limited	No	Named Places & Transportation Hubs
Eritrea	Limited	No	Named Places & Transportation Hubs
Ethiopia	Limited	No	Named Places & Transportation Hubs
Gabon	Limited	No	Named Places & Transportation Hubs
Gambia	Limited	No	Named Places & Transportation Hubs
Ghana	Limited	No	Named Places & Transportation Hubs
Morocco	Limited	No	Named Places & Transportation Hubs
Guinea-Bissau	Limited	No	Named Places & Transportation Hubs
Kenya	Limited	No	Named Places & Transportation Hubs
Liberia	Limited	No	Named Places & Transportation Hubs
Libyan Arab Jamahiriya	Limited	No	Named Places & Transportation Hubs
Lesotho	Full	No	Yes
Namibia	Full	No	Yes
Madagascar	Limited	No	Named Places & Transportation Hubs
Malawi	Limited	No	Named Places & Transportation Hubs
Mali	Limited	No	Named Places & Transportation Hubs
Mauritania	Limited	No	Named Places & Transportation Hubs
Mauritius	Limited	No	Named Places & Transportation Hubs
Mayotte	Limited	No	Named Places & Transportation Hubs
Mozambique	Limited	No	Named Places & Transportation Hubs
Niger	Limited	No	Named Places & Transportation Hubs
Nigeria	Limited	No	Named Places & Transportation Hubs
Rwanda	Limited	No	Named Places & Transportation Hubs
São Tomé and Príncipe	Limited	No	Named Places & Transportation Hubs
Senegal	Limited	No	Named Places & Transportation Hubs
Seychelles	Limited	No	Named Places & Transportation Hubs
Sierra Leone	Limited	No	Named Places & Transportation Hubs
Somalia	Limited	No	Named Places & Transportation Hubs
South Africa	Full	No	Yes
St. Helena	Limited	No	Named Places & Transportation Hubs
Sudan	Limited	No	Named Places & Transportation Hubs
Swaziland	Full	No	Yes
Tanzania, United Republic of	Limited	No	Named Places & Transportation Hubs
Togo	Limited	No	Named Places & Transportation Hubs
Tunisia	Limited	No	Named Places & Transportation Hubs
Uganda	Limited	No	Named Places & Transportation Hubs
Western Sahara	Limited	No	Named Places & Transportation Hubs
Zambia	Limited	No	Named Places & Transportation Hubs
Zimbabwe	Limited	No	Named Places & Transportation Hubs

=== Europe ===
Country	Navteq coverage	Bird's eye	Map POIs
Andorra	Full	No	Yes
Austria	Full	Yes	Yes
Belgium	Full	Yes	Named Places & Transportation Hubs
Croatia	Full	No	Yes
Czech Republic	Full	No	Yes
Denmark	Full	Yes	Yes
Estonia	Full	Yes	Yes
Finland	Full	Yes	Yes
France	Full	Yes	Yes
Germany	Full	Yes	Yes
Gibraltar	Full	No	Yes
Greece	Full	Yes	Yes
Guernsey	Full	No	Yes
Hungary	Full	No	Yes
Ireland	Full	Yes	Yes
Isle of Man	Full	No	Yes
Italy	Full	Yes	Yes
Jersey	Full	No	Yes
Latvia	Full	Yes	Yes
Liechtenstein	Full	No	Yes
Lithuania	Full	Yes	Yes
Kosovo	Full	No	Named Places & Transportation Hubs
Luxembourg	Full	Yes	Yes
Monaco	Full	Yes	Yes
Netherlands	Full	Yes	Yes
Norway	Full	Yes	Yes
Poland	Full	Yes	Yes
Portugal	Full	Yes	Yes
Russian Federation	Full	No	Yes
San Marino	Full	Yes	Yes
Slovakia	Full	No	Yes
Slovenia	Full	No	Yes
Spain	Full	Yes	Yes
Sweden	Full	Yes	Yes
Switzerland	Full	Yes	Yes
Turkey	Full	No	Yes
United Kingdom	Full	Yes	Yes
Vatican City State	Full	Yes	Yes
Albania	Full	No	Named Places & Transportation Hubs
Belarus	Full	No	Named Places & Transportation Hubs
Bosnia and Herzegowina	Full	No	Named Places & Transportation Hubs
Bulgaria	Full	No	Named Places & Transportation Hubs
Iceland	Full	No	Named Places & Transportation Hubs
Macedonia	Full	No	Named Places & Transportation Hubs
Moldova, Republic of	Full	No	Named Places & Transportation Hubs
Montenegro	Full	No	Named Places & Transportation Hubs
Romania	Full	Yes	Named Places & Transportation Hubs
Serbia	Full	Yes	Named Places & Transportation Hubs
Azerbaijan	Limited	No	Named Places & Transportation Hubs
Faroe Islands	Limited	No	Named Places & Transportation Hubs
Georgia	Limited	No	Named Places & Transportation Hubs
Armenia	Limited	No	Named Places & Transportation Hubs
Cyprus	Limited	No	Named Places & Transportation Hubs
Malta	Limited	No	Named Places & Transportation Hubs
Svalbard and Jan Mayen Islands	Limited	No	Named Places & Transportation Hubs
Ukraine	Limited	No	Named Places & Transportation Hubs

=== Asia and Oceania ===
Country	Navteq coverage	Bird's eye	Map POIs
Brunei	Full	No	Named Places & Transportation Hubs
Japan	Full	Yes	Named Places & Transportation Hubs
Afghanistan	Limited	No	Named Places & Transportation Hubs
American Samoa	Limited	No	Named Places & Transportation Hubs
Bangladesh	Limited	No	Named Places & Transportation Hubs
Bhutan	Limited	No	Named Places & Transportation Hubs
Cambodia	Limited	No	Named Places & Transportation Hubs
China	Limited	No	No
Cook Islands	Limited	No	Named Places & Transportation Hubs
Fiji	Limited	No	Named Places & Transportation Hubs
French Polynesia	Limited	No	Named Places & Transportation Hubs
Guam	Limited	No	Named Places & Transportation Hubs
Kiribati	Limited	No	Named Places & Transportation Hubs
Kyrgyzstan	Limited	No	Named Places & Transportation Hubs
Lao People's Democratic Republic	Limited	No	Named Places & Transportation Hubs
Maldives	Limited	No	Named Places & Transportation Hubs
Marshall Islands	Limited	No	Named Places & Transportation Hubs
Micronesia, Federated States of	Limited	No	Named Places & Transportation Hubs
Mongolia	Limited	No	Named Places & Transportation Hubs
Myanmar	Limited	No	Named Places & Transportation Hubs
Nauru	Limited	No	Named Places & Transportation Hubs
Nepal	Limited	No	Named Places & Transportation Hubs
New Caledonia	Limited	No	Named Places & Transportation Hubs
Niue	Limited	No	Named Places & Transportation Hubs
Norfolk Island	Limited	No	Named Places & Transportation Hubs
North Korea	Limited	No	Named Places & Transportation Hubs
Northern Mariana Islands	Limited	No	Named Places & Transportation Hubs
Pakistan	Limited	No	Named Places & Transportation Hubs
Palau	Limited	No	Named Places & Transportation Hubs
Papua New Guinea	Limited	No	Named Places & Transportation Hubs
Philippines	Limited	No	Named Places & Transportation Hubs
Solomon Islands	Limited	No	Named Places & Transportation Hubs
South Korea	Limited	No	Named Places & Transportation Hubs
Sri Lanka	Limited	No	Named Places & Transportation Hubs
Tajikistan	Limited	No	Named Places & Transportation Hubs
Timor-Leste	Limited	No	Named Places & Transportation Hubs
Tonga	Limited	No	Named Places & Transportation Hubs
Turkmenistan	Limited	No	Named Places & Transportation Hubs
Tuvalu	Limited	No	Named Places & Transportation Hubs
Uzbekistan	Limited	No	Named Places & Transportation Hubs
Vanuatu	Limited	No	Named Places & Transportation Hubs
Vietnam	Limited	No	Named Places & Transportation Hubs
Wallis and Futuna Islands	Limited	No	Named Places & Transportation Hubs
Australia	Full	Yes	Named Places & Transportation Hubs
Hong Kong	Limited	No	Yes
India	Full	Yes	Yes
Indonesia	Limited	No	Yes
Macau	Limited	No	Yes
Malaysia	Limited	No	Yes
New Zealand	Limited	No	Yes
Singapore	Limited	No	Yes
Taiwan	Limited	No	Yes
Thailand	Limited	No	Yes

=== Middle East ===
Country	Navteq coverage	Bird's eye	Map POIs
Bahrain	Full	No	Yes
Kuwait	Full	No	Yes
Oman	Full	No	Yes
Qatar	Full	No	Yes
Saudi Arabia	Full	No	Yes
United Arab Emirates	Full	No	Yes
Iran	Limited	No	Named Places & Transportation Hubs
Iraq	Limited	No	Named Places & Transportation Hubs
Israel	Limited	No	Named Places & Transportation Hubs
Lebanon	Limited	No	Named Places & Transportation Hubs
Syria	Limited	No	Named Places & Transportation Hubs
Yemen	Limited	No	Named Places & Transportation Hubs
Jordan	Full	No	No
Reunion	Full	No	No
Egypt	Limited	No	No

== See also ==
- Bing Maps
- Microsoft Streets & Trips
- Microsoft MapPoint
