= Creative Writer 2 =

Computer-based word processing program

Creative Writer 2 / Mon Atelier d'Écriture / Junior Schreibstudio
- Screenshot of Mon Atelier d'Écriture, the French version of Creative Writer 2, with a basketball theme.
- Developer(s): Microsoft Kids
- Final release: 2.0 / 1997
- Operating system: Windows 95 and up
- Predecessor: Creative Writer
- Available in: English, French
- Type: Word processing
- License: Proprietary
- Website: microsoft.com/kids/creativewriter (archived)

Creative Writer 2, known as Mon Atelier d'Écriture in French and Junior Schreibstudio in German, was a word processing program released in 1996 by Microsoft Kids. The interface was updated and the program was now designed for Windows 95.

== New or changed features ==
- The menu has been rearranged, following a study carried out by Microsoft.
- The program ran in a window, ranging in size from 640x480 pixels to 1024x768 pixels, depending on the display resolution set on the computer. It did not run in full screen.
- Microsoft's Paint It!, from their Plus for Kids pack, was included at no additional charge with Creative Writer 2. Although it was a separate program, it could be used to edit any images double-clicked in a word processing document.
- Support for creating and publishing websites was also included through Microsoft's Web Publishing Wizard.
- Support for opening and saving in Rich Text Format (.rtf) files and text files (.txt).
- Nearly a dozen of themes based on nature and sports are included to customize the program's look and feel. The demo only includes the ocean theme.

== Removed features ==
- Imaginopolis
- Support for Microsoft Word (.doc) files.
- The McZee character, although he makes a cameo appearance as a font and in the clip art gallery.

== Viewer ==
The Microsoft Creative Writer 2 Document Viewer was available free of charge. It allows users without Creative Writer 2 to view, but not edit, .max files created with Creative Writer 2.

== See also ==
- Microsoft Home
- Fine Artist
- Creative Writer
