= Hollywood High =

Hollywood High can mean:

- Hollywood High (video game), a creative writing game released in 1996
- Hollywood High (2003 film), a documentary film about the depiction of drug addiction in film
- Hollywood High (1977 film), an American sex comedy film
- Hollywood High School, a high school in Los Angeles, United States
