= Microsoft MapPoint =

Discontinued software by Microsoft

- Microsoft MapPoint North America 2009
- Developer: Microsoft
- Release: 2000; 26 years ago
- Final release: MapPoint 2013 / July 2012; 14 years ago
- Operating system: Microsoft Windows
- Type: GIS software
- License: Commercial proprietary software
- Website: https://web.archive.org/web/20080906051938/http://www.microsoft.com/mappoint/default.mspx

Microsoft MapPoint is a discontinued software program and service created by Microsoft that allows users to view, edit and integrate maps. The software and technology are designed to facilitate the geographical visualization and analysis of either included data or custom data. Numerous acquisitions (Vexcel, Vicinity Corporation, GeoTango, etc.) have supplemented both data and feature integration.

MapPoint is intended for business users but competes in the low-end geographic information system ("GIS") market. It includes all of the functionality of the most recent version of Streets and Trips, the consumer mapping software, at the time of development, as well as integration with Microsoft Office, data mapping from various sources including Microsoft Excel and a Visual Basic for Applications (VBA) interface allowing automation of the MapPoint environment.

The MapPoint technology is also used in Microsoft Streets and Trips (for North American home users), Microsoft AutoRoute (for Western European home and small business users), Encarta's atlas functionality, Bing Maps and Bing Maps Platform.

MapPoint, along with its companions Streets & Trips and Autoroute, was officially discontinued on December 31, 2014 and has no further product support. Bing Maps, along with the Windows 10 app Windows Maps are being represented as the replacement/alternative to MapPoint.

== Versions ==
Microsoft MapPoint is typically updated every two years and is available as a standalone upgrade or as a complete product. The current and final release is MapPoint 2013. The initial version was MapPoint 2000 (developing from Expedia Streets and Trips Planner 98, a consumer mapping application included with Office 97 Small Business Edition), which was slated to be included in the Office 2000 Premium Edition suite, but never was.

- MapPoint 2000, initial release
- MapPoint 2001, very similar to 2000; more of a data update
- MapPoint 2002 (v9), updated interface to Office XP style
- MapPoint 2004 (v11), last version to run on Windows 9x
- MapPoint 2006 (v13), significantly updated GPS integration and features, last version supported on Windows 2000
- MapPoint 2009 (v16), updated interface with bigger icons, core engine remains the same. This version introduced Product Activation for MapPoint Retail versions although the MSDN, Software Assurance and OEM versions did not require activation.
- MapPoint 2010 (v17), many user and API enhancements, including the ability to show/hide map symbols and labels by type
- MapPoint 2011 (v18), significantly updated map data and points of interest, last version to support Windows XP.
- MapPoint 2013 (v19), updated interface with Metro-style icons, updated map data and points of interest, added support for reviews and ratings

New versions have not always been at the same time as the equivalent Office releases despite being numbered similarly; notably the 2002 release was excluded from the Office XP suites due to a lack of equivalent programmability, and 2006 was released well before Office 2007.

Version 2009 released in late 2008, sporting an overhauled interface and better Office integration. The core map rendering engine remained the same as previous releases, and the GIS data was not updated as recently as one might expect of a product released in 2008, leaving out subdivisions, roads and other features that were completed in 2007 and which were shown on online mapping systems. MapPoint 2004 and 2006 both included 336 pushpin symbols; the 2009 version replaced these symbols with a new set of 46 pushpins, mirroring a similar change in Streets & Trips. This resulted in users trying to restore the pushpins from version 2006 and earlier. The full range of pushpins were reintroduced in MapPoint 2010 with updated visual styling.

The software is available for Microsoft Windows, and includes a less-featured edition entitled Pocket Streets for the Windows CE family of products, such as Pocket PC, and Windows Mobile for Smartphone and Automotive.

== Online ==
In 2002, Microsoft launched a free online MapPoint service. This was superseded by MSN Maps, Live Search Maps, and Bing Maps.
