= Microsoft Ancient Lands =

Multimedia software

- Developer(s): Microsoft Home
- Release: 1994
- Genre(s): Edutainment

Microsoft Ancient Lands is a 1994 "infotainment" multimedia software title, part of the Microsoft Home series, covering the ancient civilizations of Egypt, Greece, and Rome. It featured 21 animations and video sequences and 5 hours of video, and allowed users to learn about aspects of life like cooking and working.

In 1995, a computer lab was available at Andover Elementary School with Microsoft products including Ancient Lands.

The Chicago Times felt the title would appeal to teachers and parents who wanted children to be interested in history and culture. The Washington Post thought it is easy to be wrapped up in the title's wealth of information. PC Mag wrote the title could inspire children to visit a museum.
