= Microsoft Streets & Trips =

Discontinued mapping program by Microsoft

- Microsoft Streets & Trips 2013 startup screen
- Developer: Microsoft
- Release: 1988
- Final release: 2013 (19.00.18.2600) / July 1, 2012; 14 years ago
- Operating system: Windows XP and later
- Platform: IA-32
- Size: 1.4 GB
- Type: Route planning software
- License: Trialware
- Website: https://web.archive.org/web/20080914170724/http://www.microsoft.com/streets/default.mspx

Microsoft Streets & Trips, known in other countries as Microsoft AutoRoute, is a discontinued mapping program developed and distributed by Microsoft. Functionally, the last version is a subset of Microsoft MapPoint targeted at the average consumer to do a variety of map related tasks in the North American region including the United States, Canada, and Mexico, such as route planning.

It was originally developed by NextBase and released in 1988. The company was acquired by Microsoft in 1994. Its primary competitor was DeLorme, particularly its Street Atlas series of mapping software.

== Region-based editions ==
The European version is branded as Microsoft AutoRoute and covers all of Europe, including European Russia, as well as Armenia, Azerbaijan, Georgia, Cyprus and all of Turkey. AutoRoute was also produced in several European languages besides English.

== Early history ==
UK-based NextBase published Autoroute for MS-DOS in 1988. Versions were later released for Macintosh, Atari ST, and Psion PDA. In the early 1990s, it was ported to Windows. The company created a version for the United States called Automap Road Atlas which it sold through its American subsidiary Automap Inc., in Bellevue, Washington. In 1994, the product was sold to Microsoft. Microsoft combined the Encarta World Atlas Mapping Technology with new routing technology derived from Autoroute to create Automap Streets/Streets Plus and Automap Road Atlas products. In Europe, the Autoroute brand was retained.

The initial products were 16-bit with Automap Streets Plus 5.0 (1997 version) being the first 32-bit version. Automap Road Atlas was later rebranded in a future release as Automap Trip Planner. These were produced as two distinct products under the Microsoft Home division and were later rebranded for a few releases as Expedia Streets, Expedia Streets Deluxe and Expedia Trip Planner. During these early versions, core new features were added like updated maps, pushpins, weather, traffic and construction updates. In 2000, they were merged into a single product called Microsoft Expedia Streets & Trips 2000. After Microsoft spun off Expedia, later releases were rebranded as Microsoft Streets & Trips. In 2000, Microsoft also developed Microsoft MapPoint as a business mapping program for geographic analysis, based on this technology. The technology was also used in MSN Maps which later became Bing Maps.

== History of releases with Streets & Trips branding ==
Streets & Trips 2000 was the first version combining the 2 separate products. Like Expedia Trip Planner, it also included a travel guide with pictures and information on points of interest and tourist spots for a particular address. Streets & Trips 2001 dropped the travel guide but added the ability to run without the CD by copying all the map data to the disk drive.

Streets & Trips 2002 added a Pocket Streets for Windows CE devices. Like every yearly update, Streets & Trips 2002 and 2003 were also database updates with Streets & Trips 2003 adding more than 300,000 miles of streets and highways. Streets & Trips 2004 added drive-time zones, a feature to see on a map how far you could travel within a specified amount of time. Streets & Trips 2005 significantly improved the GPS features with an on-screen compass and support for USB plug and play GPS receivers.

The GPS version of Streets & Trips 2006 introduced voice-prompted directions, a hands-free option with turn-by-turn directional information. All versions starting with 2006 and later install the new text-to-speech voice, "Microsoft Anna" on Windows XP, which is part of Windows Vista, for the voice-prompt direction feature. Version 2006 of both Streets & Trips as well as AutoRoute is the last version for Windows 98 / Me and version 2007 is the last version for Windows 2000.

Streets & Trips 2008 added online services integration like MSN Direct and Live Search Maps for current traffic updates, and an automatic re-routing feature if the driver missed a turn or took a wrong turn. Streets & Trips 2008 (and older) included 336 pushpin symbols and they were easy to spot due to the use of bright colors. Streets & Trips 2009 replaced these symbols with a new set of 46 pushpins and removed many pushpins, besides reducing their contrast. In response to this, the Streets and Trips user community created a default map template which has the 2008 pin set in order to re-add them to the program. The former pushpins were restored in the 2010 version but still with the newer visual styling.

Streets & Trips 2009 also added pronunciation of street names, as part of the voice directions prompts. The map of Mexico now includes street-level data of even small towns, but the address-find feature still has not been enabled for there. This release saw the first user interface update in many years with new colorful and optionally, large toolbar icons.

Streets & Trips 2010 added hide/show pushpinsets, hide/show information balloons, import/export GPX files, export to GPS navigation device, export to mobile phone, and 348 new pushpin symbols were added, the majority restored former pins as mentioned above.

Streets & Trips 2011 is mainly a database update adding 88,000 miles of new mapping to the program and the removal of support for the ending MSN Direct service and coupon data, while allowing direct map correction feedback to maps provider Navteq and the addition of cardinal direction guidance and alternate road names to direction data. This version came out in February rather than the traditional August/September release date. No reasons were given. There was no release called Streets & Trips 2012.

The last version, Streets & Trips 2013 was released on July 1, 2012 with a new online custom ratings and reviews feature and Metro UI-style icons. Despite previous reports that the 2013 version did not accept data from older versions, the 2013 version converts the old files for usage and the user can save them in that format.

A separate version of the product was always sold with a GPS (Global Positioning System) receiver to allow users to use the product as a satellite navigation system. Since version 2008, Microsoft started requiring Product Activation for the retail versions of Streets & Trips, although Volume License (VL) versions available through MSDN did not require activation.

Microsoft announced the discontinuation of Streets & Trips in 2014, with online support for existing users to end on July 14, 2015.

All versions of Windows 10 include a free GPS-ready mapping app similar to Streets & Trips. This can be used offline, though the map data must be initially downloaded before use on a state by state, province by province basis. In the U.S. and Canada, actual (not calculated) residential and commercial street addresses are included. Voice navigation is provided to GPS-enabled devices. The drawing tools from Streets & Trips have been removed, however. The Maps app was removed in 2025.

== Compatibility ==
Streets & Trips 2006 and later are compatible with Windows Vista and later modern operating systems (Windows 7, 8, 8.1, 10).

The software had an incompatibility with Advanced Vector Extensions in x86 processors causing it to hang/freeze on the splash screen on Windows 7 SP1 64-bit. Microsoft patched Windows 7 with hotfix KB2643882.

== System requirements of the 2013 version ==
- Processor: 300 MHz or faster
- Operating system: Windows 8, Windows 7 with 1 GB RAM, Windows Vista with 1 GB RAM, Windows Server 2008 with 512 MB RAM, or Windows XP with 256 MB RAM (64-bit versions of Windows XP and Windows Server excluded); service packs for operating systems recommended.
- Hard disk space: 2.0 GB available hard disk space
- Display: Super VGA (1024 x 768) or higher resolution monitor
- Certain features require Internet Explorer. If not present, Internet Explorer will be installed but will not displace your primary browser.
- Input device: Microsoft Mouse, Microsoft IntelliMouse, or a compatible pointing device
- GPS features require a USB GPS device that supports NMEA 2.0 or later. If the GPS device supports GPX file format, the routes created in the app can be sent directly to the device.

== Reception ==
AllGame gave Streets & Trips 2001 a rating of four out of five and wrote: "Microsoft Streets and Trips 2001 is an invaluable tool for just about anyone with a vehicle, especially those who travel any of the 6.3 million miles of streets and highways in the U.S. and Canada regularly."
