= Microsoft Dangerous Creatures =

1994 educational PC program

- CD Cover art
- Developer: Microsoft
- Initial release: August 1994
- Operating system: Microsoft Windows
- Type: Encyclopedia
- License: Proprietary commercial software

Microsoft Dangerous Creatures is an educational PC program by Microsoft Home. It was designed for Windows 3.1 and first published in August 1994. It was included in the "Microsoft Home bundle pack" along with 'Encarta', 'Works Multimedia', Money and 'Arcade & Best of Windows Entertainment Pack'.

== Gameplay ==
Dangerous Creatures allows the user to investigate animals according to several categories: Atlas (animals by country), Weapons (animals that had teeth, venom, or claws), Guides (related animals), Habitats (animals from a given environment), and Index (an alphabetical list of all animals covered). Animal articles had pictures, descriptions, and video clips. It features quizzes that test the user about the animals.

== Narration and video ==
Narration was provided by three different people. The main narrator is Robert Zink, who also does the guide 'Fergus', and the other two guides (Tawny and Safara) are provided by Cindy Shrieve and Annette Romano. The original music was composed by Bill Birney. Some pictures were sourced from books (e.g. Dorling Kindersley). The videos are sourced from BBC, National Geographic, Second Line Search, Al Giddings, Bayer, Anglia TV, Oxford, Archive Films, and F. Juhos Productions.
