= Microsoft Student =

Discontinued application from Microsoft

- Developer: Microsoft
- Initial release: July 2005
- Final release: 2009 / June 2009; 16 years ago
- Operating system: Microsoft Windows
- Type: Encyclopedia
- License: Commercial proprietary software
- Website: https://web.archive.org/web/20060414015028/http://www.microsoft.com/student/default.mspx

Microsoft Student is a discontinued application from Microsoft designed to help students in schoolwork and homework. It included Encarta, as well as several student-exclusive tools such as additional Microsoft Office templates (called Learning Essentials) and integration with other Microsoft applications, like Microsoft Word. An example of that is data citations, Encarta dictionary and research Encarta features, which are available in a toolbar in Word.

The product also included Microsoft Math, language and literature resources (book summaries), and research tools (such as access to an online version of Encarta). Student 2006 was the first version of the product and a new version was produced by Microsoft every year until 2009.

Microsoft announced in March 2009 that they will cease to sell Microsoft Student and all editions of the Encarta encyclopedia by June 2009, citing changes in the way people seek information and in the traditional encyclopedia and reference material market as the key reasons behind the termination. Encarta's closing is widely attributed to competition from the larger online encyclopedia Wikipedia.
