= Encarta MindMaze =

Edutainment minigame

Encarta MindMaze is a quiz video game and minigame included in various versions of the digital multimedia encyclopedia Encarta. The game was first included in the initial 1993 edition of Encarta, and its 1995 version was bundled with some new Windows PCs. In it, players, navigating from a first-person perspective, must find their way through a maze-styled medieval fantasy castle by answering trivia questions about various subjects. While contemporaneous reviews rated MindMaze as part and parcel with Encarta itself; it was, retrospectively, and independently praised as an unexpectedly fun minigame and a successful example of edutainment.

== Gameplay ==
MindMaze is somewhat hidden within Encarta: Leah J. Simmons, in a 2020 piece for Kotaku Australia, introduced the game as "the best Easter egg of them all"; Deirdre Coyle, writing for Unwinnable Monthly, had found it accidentally by pressing Ctrl + Z.

After entering a username, players click on objects on screen to interact with them. In order to access another room, they will need to correctly answer a trivia question. Players can choose the level of difficulty and subject matter of the trivia questions. If they answer the trivia question quickly, they gain more points than if they take a longer time to answer it. Players can also click on other objects and people in the scene. There are five match buttons. Clicking one will exhaust it and temporarily show the path through the maze. If the player successfully traverses the maze, they can break a curse on the castle.

== Development ==
According to Amy Raby, development manager for the Encarta team, MindMaze was developed by another company. Unfortunately, its first iteration was created in an interpreted language like Visual Basic, which made it run slowly. After its initial release in 1993, Bill Gates complained about its slow speed. The 1994 release was written or re-written in C++.

== Reception ==
Patrick Marshall, in an April 1993 issue of Infoworld, called MindMaze one of Encarta's most entertaining features. He praised its variable difficulty and how the trivia questions provided "opportunities for digressions" to read the relevant encyclopedia articles.

In the CD-ROMs Rated review of the 1994 release, Krantz described MindMaze as a "unique feature" that allowed players to temporarily leave the game and read more on the trivia subjects.

Recalling MindMaze nostalgically, merritt k praised its straightforward position as an edutainment game, including the way it encouraged players to find answers to the trivia questions in the Encarta encyclopedia.
