= The Encyclopedia of Popular Music =

Musical encyclopedia book series by Colin Larkin

The Encyclopedia of Popular Music – 4th Edition (10 volumes)
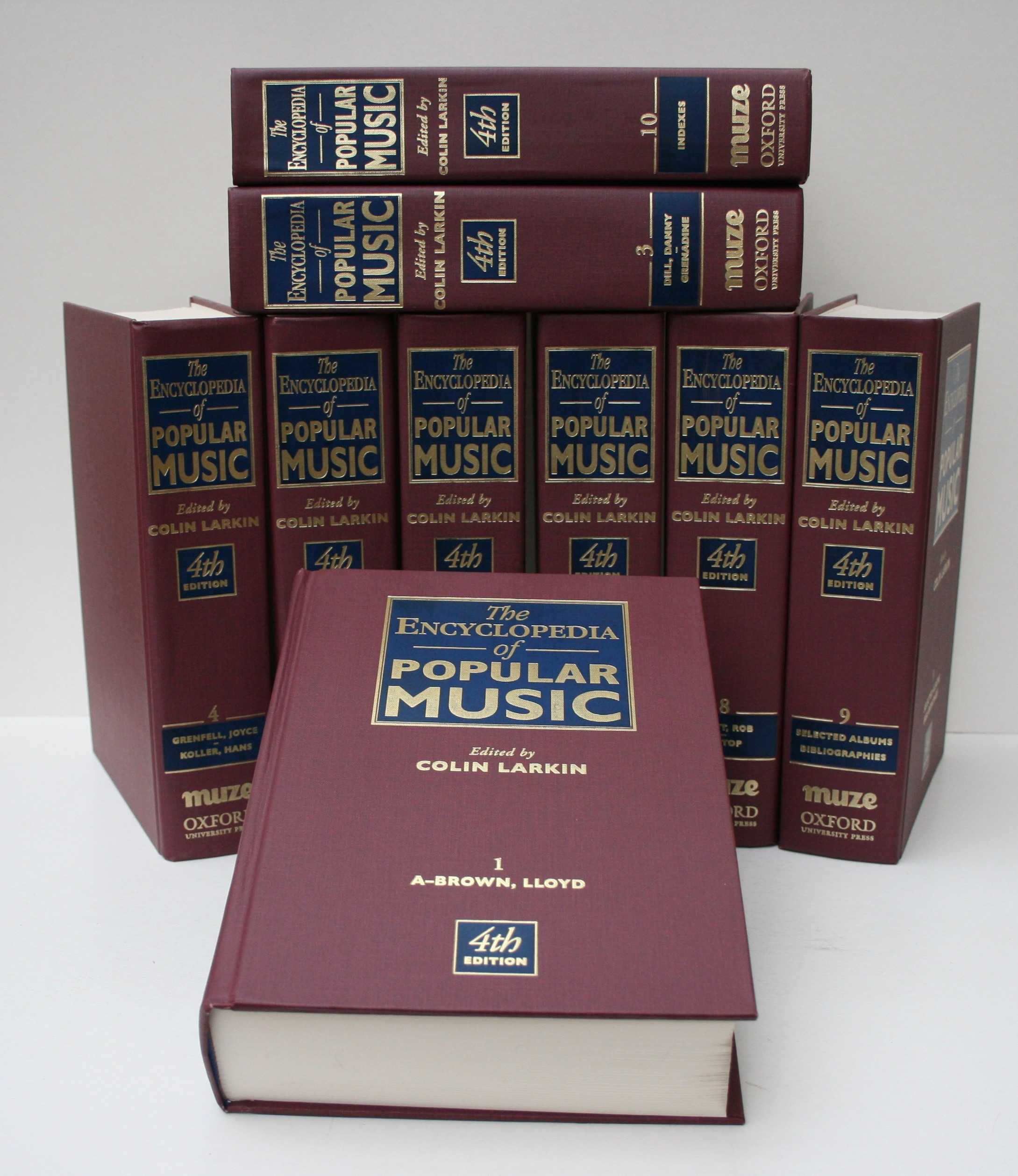
- Author: Colin Larkin
- Language: English
- Subject: Music, Reference work
- Publisher: Oxford University Press
- Publication date: 2006
- Publication place: United Kingdom, United States
- Media type: Print Hardback
- Pages: 8876
- ISBN: 978-0-19-531373-4

The Encyclopedia of Popular Music – 5th Concise Edition
- Author: Colin Larkin
- Language: English
- Subject: Music, Reference work
- Genre: non-fiction
- Publisher: Omnibus Press
- Publication date: 2007
- Publication place: United Kingdom
- Media type: Print Hardback
- Pages: 1600
- ISBN: 978-1-84609-856-7

The Encyclopedia of Popular Music is an encyclopedia created in 1989 by Colin Larkin. It has been dubbed the "modern man's" equivalent of the Grove Dictionary of Music, which Larkin describes less flatteringly. It has been published by Virgin Books and (from 2006) by the Oxford University Press. It was described in The Times as "the standard against which all others must be judged".

== History ==
Larkin believed that rock music and popular music were at least as significant historically as classical music, and as such, should be given definitive treatment and properly documented. The Encyclopedia of Popular Music is the result. In 1989, Larkin sold his half of the publishing company Scorpion Books to finance his ambition to publish an encyclopedia of popular music. Aided by a team of initially 70 contributors, he set about compiling the data in a pre-internet age, "relying instead on information gleaned from music magazines, individual expertise and a hideous amount of legwork". He financed and founded a new company, Square One Books, to publish the encyclopedia. The first edition of the encyclopedia "pushed Larkin to the brink of bankruptcy". It was a four-volume set and went into print in 1992.

There have been three further editions of the multi-volume encyclopedia and dozens of single-volume spin-offs of five concise versions of the main encyclopedia, including four editions of jazz.

In 1995, Microsoft licensed the text for their CD-ROM, Microsoft Music Central, which sold 497,000 copies.

In 1997, Larkin's company, along with the Encyclopedia, was sold to the data company Muze Inc. (the UK name was changed to Muze UK), because Larkin wanted "to guarantee its future" in the fast changing world of information and communications technology. He became full-time editor-in-chief on the project, running a "surprisingly small scale cottage industry", stating "There are now fewer than 10 contributors on the team...People don't believe it's done on such a small scale, but in terms of words we are producing an Agatha Christie novel a month..."

== Status ==
The Encyclopedia of Popular Music covers popular music from the early 1900s, including folk, blues, country, R&B, jazz, rock, heavy metal, reggae, electronic music and hip-hop.

"Each biography contains a thorough synopsis of the performer and their body of work, following their career from beginning to end. The 4th Edition is 10,000 pages long in 10 separate volumes with over 8 million words and 27,000 entries. The nature of popular music and jazz is such that it is ever changing, evolving and growing and therefore needs a new edition much more frequently than more static subjects."

Guinness Publishing, Virgin Publishing and Omnibus Press have produced the spin-offs on each subject and Larkin's All Time Top 1000 Albums is produced as a companion volume. The large single volume of the Concise edition of The Encyclopedia of Popular Music is in its 5th edition as of 2007.

The total sales of the EPM series since 1992 is over 650,000 copies.

In 2006, Oxford University Press began to publish the full 4th edition of the encyclopedia online.

In May 2011 Omnibus Press released the Amazon Kindle edition of The Encyclopedia of Popular Music. The text for this edition has not been updated and the Kindle edition has the same content as the 2007 edition.

== Editions ==
- Guinness Encyclopedia of Popular Music (1st Edition, 4 Vols), Guinness Publishing 1992, ed. Larkin Colin.
- Guinness Encyclopedia of Popular Music (2nd Edition, 6 Vols), Guinness Publishing 1995 (UK), ed. Larkin, Colin.
- The Encyclopedia of Popular Music (3rd Edition, 8 Vols), Macmillan (UK/USA) 1999, ed. Larkin, Colin.
- The Encyclopedia of Popular Music (4th Edition, 10 Vols), Oxford University Press (UK/USA) 2006, ed. Larkin, Colin.

=== Concise editions ===
- Guinness Encyclopedia of Popular Music Concise Edition, Guinness Publishing 1993, ed. Larkin, Colin.
- The Virgin Encyclopedia of Popular Music, Concise Edition, Virgin Books (UK), 1997, ed. Larkin, Colin.
- The Virgin Encyclopedia of Popular Music, Concise (3rd Edition), Virgin Books (UK), 1999, ed. Larkin, Colin.
- The Virgin Encyclopedia of Popular Music, Concise (4th Edition), Virgin Books (UK), 2002, ed. Larkin, Colin.
- The Encyclopedia of Popular Music: Concise (5th Edition), Omnibus Press 2007, ed. Larkin, Colin

== Spin-offs ==
=== Guinness Who's Who ===
- Larkin, Colin (ed.), Guinness Who's Who of Jazz, Guinness Publishing (UK), 1992.
- Larkin, Colin (ed.), Guinness Who's Who of Sixties Music, Guinness Publishing (UK), 1992.
- Larkin, Colin (ed.), Guinness Who's Who of Indie And New Wave Music, Guinness Publishing (UK), 1992.
- Larkin, Colin (ed.), Guinness Who's Who of Heavy Metal, Guinness Publishing (UK), 1992.
- Larkin, Colin (ed.), Guinness Who's Who of Seventies Music, Guinness Publishing (UK), 1993.
- Larkin, Colin (ed.), Guinness Who's Who of Folk Music, Guinness Publishing (UK), 1993.
- Larkin, Colin (ed.), Guinness Who's Who of Soul Music, Guinness Publishing (UK), 1993.
- Larkin, Colin (ed.), Guinness Who's Who of Blues, Guinness Publishing (UK), 1993.
- Larkin, Colin (ed.), Guinness Who's Who of Fifties Music, Guinness Publishing (UK), 1993.
- Larkin, Colin (ed.), Guinness Who's Who of Country Music, Guinness Publishing (UK), 1993.
- Larkin, Colin (ed.), Guinness Who's Who of Stage Musicals, Guinness Publishing (UK), 1994.
- Larkin, Colin (ed.), Guinness Who's Who of Rap, Dance & Techno, Guinness Publishing (UK), 1994.
- Larkin, Colin (ed.), Guinness Who's Who of Film Musicals & Musical Films, Guinness Publishing 1994
- Larkin, Colin (ed.), Guinness Who's Who of Reggae, Guinness Publishing (UK), 1994.
- Larkin, Colin (ed.), Guinness Who's Who of Jazz (2nd Edition), Guinness Publishing (UK), 1995.
- Larkin, Colin (ed.), Guinness Who's Who of Indie And New Wave (2nd Edition), Guinness Publishing 1995.
- Larkin, Colin (ed.), Guinness Who's Who of Blues (2nd Edition), Guinness Publishing (UK), 1995.
- Larkin, Colin (ed.), Guinness Who's Who of Heavy Metal (2nd Edition), Guinness Publishing (UK), 1995.

=== The Virgin Encyclopedia ===
- Larkin, Colin (ed.), The Virgin Encyclopedia of Popular Music, Concise Edition, Virgin Books (UK), 1997.
- Larkin, Colin (ed.), The Virgin Encyclopedia of Seventies Music, Virgin Books (UK), 1997.
- Larkin, Colin (ed.), The Virgin Encyclopedia of Sixties Music, Virgin Books (UK), 1997.
- Larkin, Colin (ed.), The Virgin Encyclopedia of Eighties Music, Virgin Books (UK), 1997.
- Larkin, Colin (ed.), The Virgin Encyclopedia of Fifties Music, Virgin Books (UK), 1998.
- Larkin, Colin (ed.), The Virgin Encyclopedia of Indie & New Wave, Virgin Books (UK), 1998.
- Larkin, Colin (ed.), The Virgin Encyclopedia of R&B And Soul, Virgin Books (UK), 1998.
- Larkin, Colin (ed.), The Virgin Encyclopedia of Country Music, Virgin Books (UK), 1998.
- Larkin, Colin (ed.), The Virgin Encyclopedia of Reggae, Virgin Books (UK), 1998.
- Larkin, Colin (ed.), The Virgin Encyclopedia of Stage & Film Musicals, Virgin Books (UK), 1999.
- Larkin, Colin (ed.), The Virgin Encyclopedia of Heavy Rock, Virgin Books (UK), 1999.
- Larkin, Colin (ed.), The Virgin Encyclopedia of Jazz (3rd Edition), Virgin Books (UK), 1999.
- Larkin, Colin (ed.), The Virgin Encyclopedia of Dance Music, Virgin Books (UK), 1999.
- Larkin, Colin (ed.), The Virgin Encyclopedia of Stage & Film Musicals, Virgin Books (UK), 1999.
- Larkin, Colin (ed.), The Virgin Encyclopedia of Nineties Music, Virgin Books (UK), 2000.
- Larkin, Colin (ed.), The Virgin Encyclopedia of 60s Music,(3rd Edition), Virgin Books (UK), 2002.
- Larkin, Colin (ed.), The Virgin Encyclopedia of 50s Music, (3rd Edition), Virgin Books (UK), 2002.
- Larkin, Colin (ed.), The Virgin Encyclopedia of 70s Music, (3rd Edition), Virgin Books (UK), 2002.
- Larkin, Colin (ed.), The Virgin Encyclopedia of Popular Music, Concise (4th Edition), Virgin Books (UK), 2002.
- Larkin, Colin (ed.), The Virgin Encyclopedia of 80s Music, (3rd Edition), Virgin Books (UK), 2003.
- Larkin, Colin (ed.), Virgin Encyclopedia of Jazz (4th Edition), Virgin Books (UK), 2004.

==== The Virgin Illustrated Encyclopedia ====
- Larkin, Colin, (ed) The Virgin Illustrated Encyclopedia of Rock, Virgin Books (UK), 1998. (also published in the US as The Billboard Illustrated Encyclopedia of Rock. (US 1998)
- Larkin, Colin, (ed) The Virgin Illustrated Encyclopedia of Pop & Rock, Virgin Books (UK), 2002, (also published in the US as The Billboard Illustrated Encyclopedia of Pop & Rock (US 2002).

=== All-Time Top 1000 Albums ===
- Larkin, Colin, All Time Top 1000 Albums, Guinness Publishing (UK), 1994.
- Larkin, Colin, The Virgin All-Time Top 1000 Albums (2nd Edition), Virgin Books (UK), 1998.
- Larkin, Colin, The Virgin All-Time Top 1000 Albums (Pocket Edition), Virgin Books (UK), 1999.
- Larkin, Colin, All-Time Top 1000 Albums (3rd Edition), Virgin Books (UK), 2000.
