= Hollywood (video game) =

1995 creative writing game by Theatrix Interactive

Hollywood is a creative writing game released in 1995 by Theatrix Interactive for Windows and Macintosh.

== Gameplay ==
Users input text and can watch the characters read it. The game features a choice of 24 scenes and multiple cartoon animal characters.

Hollywood features ten cartoon characters:

- Larry, a yellow hippie dog.
- Sid, a purple anteater in a blue business suit.
- Tiffany, a glamorous orange dog.
- Artie, a nerdy-looking alligator.
- Charlotte, a policewoman fox.
- Chuck, a palm tree in a flower shirt and lei.
- Billie, A purple dog with glasses and pink hair.
- JJ, a cool dog with a backwards baseball cap.
- Bev, a fat pink cat with blue hair in a green jacket and knee highs.
- Lucille, a pig with curly blonde hair and a red jacket.

Users may change the voices, names, and jobs/interests of the characters.

When Hollywood and Hollywood High were installed on the same computer, the two could be combined by using a key received by calling Theatrix after launching the "Unlock Hollywood" program; however, since the developer is now defunct, this feature is no longer available.

== Reception ==
Entertainment Weekly gave the game an A−.

Hollywood won the 1996 Codie award for Best Home Creativity Software Program.
