= Microsoft Music Central =

CD-ROM music encyclopedia by Microsoft Home

Microsoft Music Central is a discontinued music encyclopedia on CD-ROM produced by Microsoft, similar to their Cinemania product and part of the Microsoft Home range. The corpus includes a selection of biographical articles from the Guinness Encyclopedia of Popular Music a spin-off of the Encyclopedia of Popular Music written by Colin Larkin, album reviews from Q Magazine alongside new ones, and still images and full-motion video clips. Two editions were released – one in 1996 and another in 1997.

The encyclopedia also allows browsing by artist, album, and genre, searching for particular keywords, and viewing portraits, album covers, song clips and video clips in the gallery. Music Central includes informational 'tours' led by the recorded voice of an artist (or an imitation of their voice, in the case of Little Richard) on their own musical genre. The tour directs the user to particular articles and media.

Microsoft Music Central Online was a similar product that was launched concurrently, described by Microsoft as an electronic magazine. In addition to the information found on the encyclopedia, it featured new interviews, reviews, articles, and music news. For a time, Microsoft compiled this new information and made it available for offline download as monthly updates for owners of the digital encyclopedia.

== See also ==
- Microsoft Home
- Reference software
