= Microsoft Response Point =

Microsoft telephony system

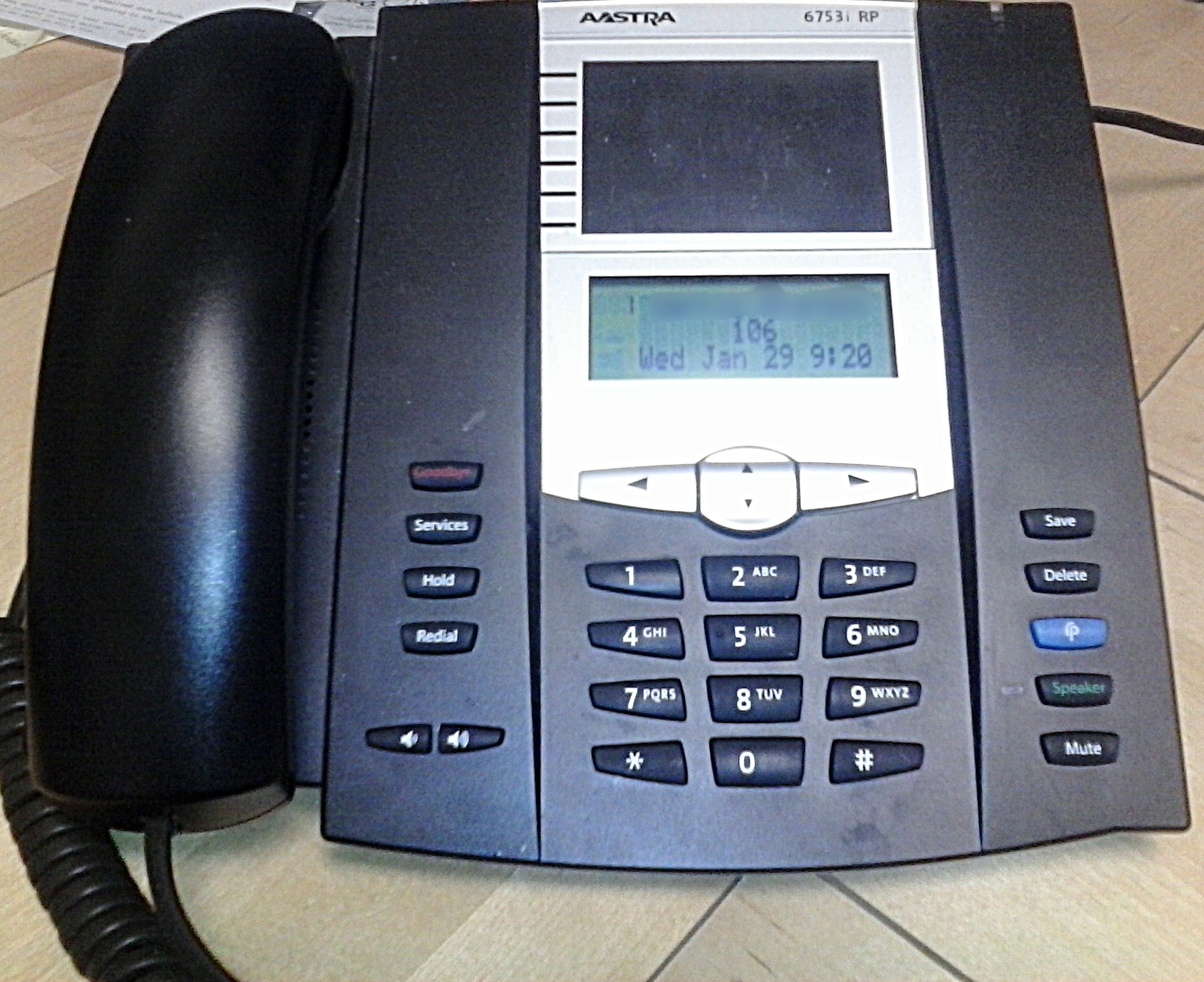
- Aastra 6753i RP, a typical Response Point phone
- Developer: Microsoft
- Manufacturer: Various
- Type: PBX system
- Released: March 2007; 19 years ago
- Discontinued: May 14, 2010; 16 years ago

Microsoft Response Point was an advanced software-based telephone system developed by Microsoft. Response Point, a PBX system targeting small businesses with less than 50 employees, was launched in March 2007, with systems available on the market in the fourth quarter of that year. Response Point is VoIP-based, and uses SIP as its signaling and call setup protocol. Response Point supports voicemail and multi-party calling in addition to two party VoIP calls. Response Point features innovative voice recognition technology to manage calls and voice mail. Voicemail messages can, optionally, be sent to e-mail where they can be retrieved and archived. Response Point voice dialing can work with the Response Point phone directory which is currently limited to 1100 contacts per user. Contacts may be imported from the Windows Address Book or Microsoft Outlook. Response Point automatically detects gateways and phones connected to the network.

Quanta's Syspine was the first OEM product on the market. D-Link followed shortly afterward with their VoiceCenter product. Aastra became the third OEM entry with a system, Aastralink RP, introduced in July 2008 coinciding with the delivery of Response Point Service Pack 1.

Announcements in September 2008 have added additional manufacturers providing new gateway options (a T1/E1/PRI gateway and a 4-port FXS gateway) and new phone options (full-duplex conference room phones).

The system was discontinued on May 14, 2010.

== Service Pack 1 ==
Microsoft Response Point Service Pack 1 (RP SP1) was released in July 2008, announced by former Microsoft Chairman Bill Gates. The update included the following features:

- Click-to-Call Dialing (the ability to double-click or right-click on a co-worker's extension or an imported Outlook contact, and automatically dial the phone in that fashion)
- SIP trunking support (SIP trunking allows an PBX owner to replace traditional PSTN lines with PSTN connectivity via a SIP trunking service provider (ITSP). This new support allows RP to use a supported SIP Trunking provider if there is an internet connection provided to the RP base unit)
- Direct-inward-dial (DID) support when used with a SIP Trunking provider (ITSP)
- Enhanced call logging functionality in the RP Administrator program
- Several call handling and performance improvements
- Updates and enhancements to the RP Assistant and RP Administrator programs
- 'Barge in' which allows users to interrupt a voice prompt with a voice command, rather than being required to wait for the voice prompt to complete before speaking the command.

== Service Pack 2 ==
Microsoft Response Point Service Pack 2 (RP SP2) was released in January 2009. The update included the following features:

- Intercom allows you to make 2-way intercom calls or send 1-way pages to individuals or groups using the intercom system.
- Customizable URLs in notification windows. Integrate with 3rd-party applications to customize the links that appear inside incoming call notifications.
- Customizable after-hours schedule. Schedule the Automated Receptionist to handle calls after hours, on holidays, and during business closures.
- VPN access. Enable VPN access so that people can use the phone system from remote networks.
- VoIP gateway device. Configure VoIP service with an on-premises gateway device that helps improve service quality.
- Automatic parked-call return. Have callers waiting in park for 3 minutes automatically returned to the person who originally handled the call.
- Digital service. Configure voice service with a digital service provider. Digital service is often referred to as "T1", "E1", "PRI", or "ISDN" by some service providers and in different regions.
- Call-forwarding message. Turn on or off an announcement that notifies people when calls are forwarded.
- Multi-function gateway devices. Configure hybrid gateway devices that have both FXO and FXS ports, or can be used for either analog or digital service.
- Improved DTMF detection. Change the channel that detects touch tones to reduce speech misrecognition, often caused by background noise and variable service requirements.

== Upcoming Features ==
In their Town Hall meeting on October 30, 2008, Microsoft released a roadmap of upcoming features. The roadmap was split into two categories - 'Sooner' and 'Later'. The 'Sooner' release was released in January 2009 as Service Pack 2. The 'Later' release was expected to be shipped as Response Point 2 by end of Q1 2010. Since May 2009 however the details of Response Point's next version has become uncertain in terms of its timing and feature set according to a recent article by Paul Spain.

Microsoft has also postponed its Chinese Response Point release.

The 'Later' (Response Point 2.0) release was originally expected to include:

- Also-ring
- Automatic backup
- Busy Lamp Field (the lights indicating which phones are being used)
- Branch offices
- Conferencing
- Dial plan
- International
- Key-system-like experience
- Microsoft Outlook add-in
- Remote web admin
- Soft phone
- Speech/blue-btn enhancements

== Discontinued ==
On May 14, 2010, Microsoft officially announced that it was discontinuing Response Point, citing lack of demand for Response Point phones.

It is possible to move the Microsoft software from the Response Point Base Unit and onto a virtual server in order to extend the system life.
