= Microsoft Musical Instruments =

1992 educational software

- Developer(s): Microsoft
- Initial release: 1992; 33 years ago
- Operating system: Microsoft Windows
- Available in: English
- Type: Educational

Microsoft Musical Instruments is a 1992 educational software for Windows 3.1 which is an interactive encyclopedia of musical instruments. It contains 203 musical instruments from around the world, including pictures and audio samples of every instrument. Instruments are categorized by type, region, and are also shown in alphabetical order. Notable musical ensembles are also included.
