= Microsoft Art Gallery =

Microsoft Art Gallery is a 1993 educational and interactive guide for the London National Gallery published by Microsoft.

== Production ==
The software was originally developed by Cognitive Applications in the UK in 1991 as a multimedia learning tool for use in Britain's National Gallery. It was originally called "Micro Gallery"; Microsoft then released a digitised version entitled Microsoft Art Gallery. The software went on sale in Britain in October 1993, and was released in Australia later that year.

== Content ==
The title allows players to explore various works of art in an interactive and multimedia way. It features the work of the national Gallery of London. The title contains schema links, allowing the player to explore related content in a seamless way.

== Critical reception ==
PC Mag thought the software was "stylishly designed and carefully presented", further praising its elegant and easily navigable interface. When comparing art titles, The New York Times felt the title would appeal to those with "more catholic taste", and praised its "authoritative professionalism" as standing out from other titles in the genre. The paper Hypermedia Design, Analysis, and Evaluation Issues deemed the title an "outstanding" and "enjoyable" application. Art historian James Moore who reviewed the CD-ROM late in 2001 felt the software was primitive from a 2001 perspective. PC World thought that lovers of art would be able to easily sink hours into the title.
