= Microsoft Math Solver =

Educational mathematics application

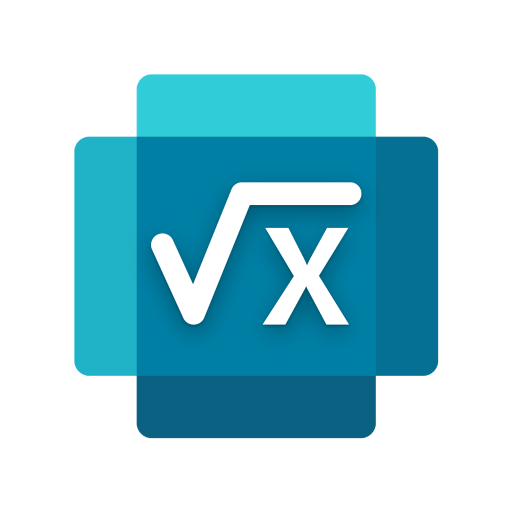
- Developer: Microsoft

Stable release(s)
- Android: 23.3.401205602 / December 5, 2022; 3 years ago
- iOS: 1.0.23 / March 17, 2021; 5 years ago
- Office: 2.0.040811.01 / December 20, 2019; 6 years ago
- Web: Rolling
- Platform: Web platform, Android, Microsoft Office
- Type: Mathematical software
- License: Freeware
- Website: math.microsoft.com

Microsoft Math Solver (formerly Microsoft Mathematics and Microsoft Math) was an entry-level educational app that solved math and science problems. Developed and maintained by Microsoft, it was primarily targeted at students as a learning tool. Until 2015, it ran on Microsoft Windows. Since then, it has been developed for the web platform and mobile devices.

Microsoft Math was originally released as a bundled part of Microsoft Student. It was then available as a standalone paid version starting with version 3.0. For version 4.0, it was released as a free downloadable product and was called Microsoft Mathematics 4.0. It is no longer in active development and has been removed from the Microsoft website. A related freeware add-in, called "Microsoft Mathematics Add-In for Word and OneNote," was also available from Microsoft and offered comparable functionality (Word 2007 or higher is required).

Microsoft Math received the 2008 Award of Excellence from Tech & Learning Magazine.

Microsoft Math was retired on July 7, 2025.

== Features ==
Microsoft Math contained features that are designed to assist in solving mathematics, science, and tech-related problems, as well as to educate the user. The application featured such tools as a graphing calculator and a unit converter. It also included a triangle solver and an equation solver that provides step-by-step solutions to each problem.

== Versions ==
- Microsoft Math 1.0: Part of Microsoft Student 2006
- Microsoft Math 2.0: Part of Microsoft Student 2007
- Microsoft Math 3.0: Standalone commercial product that requires product activation; includes calculus support, digital ink recognition features and a special display mode for video projectors
- Encarta Calculator: Lite version of Microsoft Math 3.0; part of Microsoft Student 2008
- Microsoft Mathematics 4.0 (removed): The first freeware version, released in 32-bit and 64-bit editions in January 2011; features a ribbon GUI
- Microsoft Math for Windows Phone (removed): A branded mobile application for Windows Phone released in 2015 specifically for South African and Tanzanian students; also known as Nokia Mobile-Mathematics or Nokia Momaths
- Microsoft Math in Bing app – Math helper as a feature within the Bing mobile app on iOS and Android platforms, released in August 2018
- Microsoft Math Solver – Mobile app for iOS (first released in November 2019-No longer available in August 2024.) and Android (first released in December 2019), as well as a Microsoft Edge extension. Recognizes handwritten math. Provides a detailed step-by-step explanation, interactive graphs, relevant online video lectures, and practice problems. A web version is available on mathsolver.microsoft.com.

== System requirements ==
The system requirements for Microsoft Mathematics 4.0 are:

Parameters	Minimum requirements	Recommended requirements
Processor	Pentium 500 MHz or equivalent	Pentium 1 GHz or equivalent
Operating system	Microsoft Windows XP SP3 or later	
RAM	256 MB	512 MB
Hard drive	65 MB free space	
Graphics	800 x 600 resolution, 8-bit color	1024 x 768 resolution, 24-bit color
Other requirements	.NET Framework 3.5 SP1	

== See also ==
- Grapher
- Maple (software)
- Symbolab
- Wolfram Mathematica
- WolframAlpha
