= Microsoft Fingerprint Reader =

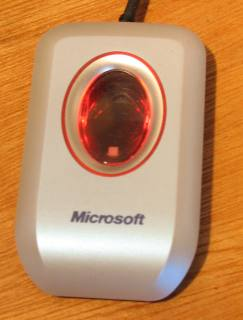
Microsoft Fingerprint Reader

Microsoft Fingerprint Reader was a device sold by Microsoft, primarily for homes and small businesses. The underlying software providing the biometrics was developed by Digital Persona. First released on September 4, 2004, this device was supported by Windows XP and Windows Vista x86 operating systems. It was discontinued shortly after Windows Vista was released.

Fingerprint readers can be more secure, reliable and convenient than a traditional password, although they have been subject to spoofing. A fingerprint recognition system is more tightly linked to a specific user than, e.g. an access card, which can be stolen.

== Functionality ==
The Fingerprint Reader's software allows the registration of up to ten fingerprints per device. Login names and passwords associated with the registered fingerprints were stored in a database on the user's computer.

On presentation of an authorized fingerprint, the software passes the associated login names and passwords to compatible applications and websites, allowing login without a keyboard. If the software finds that the particular fingerprint does not match one it its database, it declines the access.

== Application ==
=== 64-bit Windows ===
The Microsoft Fingerprint Reader may be modified to work with 64-bit Windows.

=== Firefox browser ===
The reader works with Firefox using the FingerFox Add-on.

== See also ==
- Fingerprint
- Fingerprint Verification Competition
