= Micro gallery =

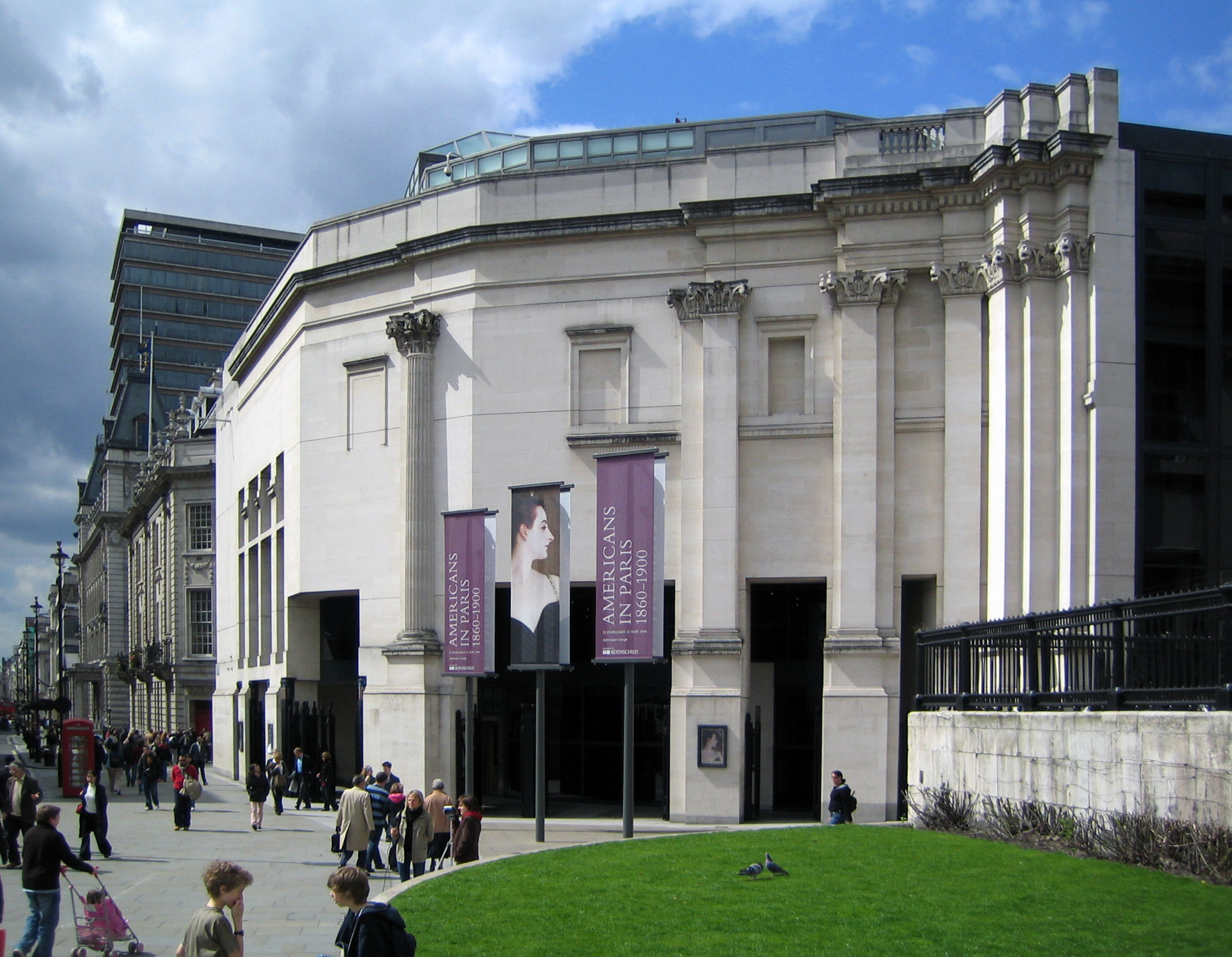
The Sainsbury Wing at the National Gallery in London, location of the Micro Gallery.

A micro gallery was a computer-based guide to archives and museum collections, first developed for the collections at the National Gallery in London, UK. It took three years to develop by the company Cognitive Applications, and opened in July 1991 as part of the facilities in the Sainsbury Wing. Visitors could use the system to determine which pictures they would like to see in the gallery. It was possible to print out personalised information for use during the visit. The Micro Gallery ran for 14 years and a CD-ROM with similar facilities was produced.

In 1995, a similar facility was produced for the National Gallery of Art in Washington, D.C., USA.
