= The Ultimate Haunted House =

1993 video game

Gahan Wilson's The Ultimate Haunted House
- Developer: Byron Preiss Multimedia Brooklyn Multimedia
- Publisher: Microsoft Home
- Designer: Gahan Wilson
- Engine: Macromedia
- Platforms: Apple Macintosh, Microsoft Windows
- Release: 1993
- Genre: Adventure game
- Mode: Single player

The Ultimate Haunted House is a computer adventure game developed by Byron Preiss Multimedia/Brooklyn Multimedia and published and distributed by Microsoft Home. It places the player in the middle of a bizarrely humorous and eerie haunted house populated by Wilson's wacky characters. The player must explore 13 rooms, find 13 hidden keys, and build a monster from spare parts, before the mystery clock strikes 13.

The game was drawn by The New Yorker cartoonist Gahan Wilson, who also appears as a character in the game. Walt Freitag and Barbara Lanza are credited as writers and designers, and Judson Rosebush as director. The game runs on Mac OS 7 and Microsoft Windows 3.1.

== Gameplay ==
Game play consists of interacting with a cast of ghoulish residents who populate the house and move about it, and in collecting and exchanging an inventory of items with them. All of the main characters, as well as the house itself, contain artificial personalities that react to the actions of the player, and the house may be explored in any order. Dozens of activities and puzzles embedded in the game also have consequences. These activities include a monster assembly lab, monster movies in the screening room, cooking a concoction in the kitchen, composing an organ tune, and other traditional puzzle games adapted to the computer. The game contains many distinct voices and the opening tune "Monster Mash".

A cast of characters populate the house and make appearances throughout in the game. These include Frankenstein, a vampiress, a two-headed monster, a mad scientist, and a normal human child (transported there by the mad scientist's lab ray). Gahan Wilson is a ghost in the game, but there are two Gahans: one good, one evil, and deciphering which is which is one of the elements of game play. The thirteen rooms include a menagerie, kitchen, foyer, torture chamber, the monster lab, the screening room, the game room, a library, an attic, a bathroom, a basement hallway, a music room, and an art gallery. There are also several monsters whose interaction with the player is limited to placing curses upon them.

== Critical reception ==
The Associated Press called the game "straight-out fun," praising in particular Wilson's "visual wit." The Washington Post also praised the game's humor, comparing it favorably to The Addams Family.
