= Hollywood High (video game) =

Creative writing game released in 1996

Hollywood High is a creative writing game released in 1996 by Theatrix Interactive. It is the sequel to Theatrix's Hollywood. The game features a choice of 37 scenes and multiple human cartoon characters. Users input text and watch the characters read it. Although Theatrix Interactive has since become defunct, the program was picked up by Tom Snyder productions, a division of Scholastic Corporation. The software can also be bought online directly from the main site. The product was available in Windows (R) 95, Windows 3.1, and Macintosh (R) CD-ROM formats.

The seed for Hollywood High was planted when Theatrix asked users what type of game they would like to see next, and there was much enthusiasm for a computer game based on teenage life.

Hollywood High features nine teenage characters (four boys and five girls), a mother, an athletic coach and a baby sibling. Players may change the voices, names, and jobs/interests of the characters. The characters include:

- Lily, a bubblegum-chewing girl with a blonde ponytail, identified in the Hollywood High promotional material as "Lily the ponytail girl"
- Matt, a brown-haired grunge aficionado, identified in the promotional material as "Matt the flannel shirt kid"
- Gus, a blonde punk rocker
- Anna, a female basketball player
- Gary, an African-American nerd in a red sweater and sporting a hi-top fade haircut
- Baby, a baby in a high chair
- Glenn, an Asian black-haired teen with a blue sweatshirt and hood
- Ruth, a red-headed babysitter
- Ed, an Asian athletic coach
- Jenny, an African-American soccer player sporting the number 7
- Susan, a parent with a blonde ponytail
- Stella, an Asian class clown wearing a large blue hat

There are 55 settings available in all, including the mall, the bathroom, the beach, prom and the eye of a storm.

When Theatrix's Hollywood and Hollywood High were installed on the same computer, the two could be combined by using a key received by calling Theatrix after launching the "Unlock Hollywood" program; however, since the developer is now defunct, this feature is no longer available, and Scholastic has not picked this back up, due to low demand.

A web series, based on and created with the game was launched in 2012, using the same settings and characters but with drastically altered personalities and roles.

== Similar games ==
- 3D Movie Maker
- The Movies
- The Simpsons: Cartoon Studio

== See also ==
First Episode of Hollywood High Web Series
