= Theatrix Interactive =

Defunct software company

- Corporate logo of Theatrix Interactive, used from 1996 to 1998
- Founded: 1982; 44 years ago
- Founder: Joyce Hakansson
- Defunct: August 12, 1997
- Fate: Defunct, acquired by Sanctuary Woods
- Headquarters: United States

Theatrix Interactive, Inc. was a software company that produced such computer games as Hollywood, Hollywood High, Bumptz Science Carnival, Snootz Math Trek, and the Juilliard Music Adventure. The company was founded in 1982 by Joyce Hakansson with the ambition to create educational software.

Originally called Berkeley Learning Technologies, Hakansson's company created more than 50 children's products for other software publishers including Edmark, Broderbund, and Davidson. Award-winning titles include "Millie's Math House" and "Bailey¹s Book House," published by Edmark, and "The Cruncher," published by Davidson. In addition to software programs, the company designed and produced titles for electronic learning toy companies including Sega, Texas Instruments, Tiger Electronics, and many others.

In May, 1995, the company announced its move into the publishing arena under a new name: Theatrix Interactive, Inc.

On August 12, 1997, Sanctuary Woods acquired 100% of the outstanding shares of Theatrix.
