= Microsoft Dinosaurs =

Interactive simulation by Microsoft

- Developer: Microsoft
- Release: 1993
- Final release: 1.0
- Operating system: Microsoft Windows 3.1, Macintosh System 6
- Type: Educational
- License: Proprietary commercial software

Microsoft Dinosaurs is an educational interactive CD-ROM developed by Microsoft, themed around dinosaurs.

== Production ==
Microsoft invested in access to the entire library of writing and images of reference publishing house Dorling Kindersley. They used it to create content for the Microsoft Home software line, including Microsoft Dinosaurs.

== Gameplay ==
The game contains 400MB of dinosaur-related information, including full-motion video, audio, and a gallery of scanned artwork. The main program features 1000 illustrations, 200 hypertext articles, and 800 pop-up windows. Players can explore the content in four different ways: Atlas, Timeline, Families, and Index. There is also a guided tour, hosted by "Dino" Don Lessem. The game contains sequences featuring dinosaurs feeding, fighting and breeding, which had previously been broadcast in an American television series put out by the Public Broadcasting Service, and the Phil Tippett short Prehistoric Beast.

== Animals Featured ==
=== Dinosaurs ===
- Albertosaurus
- Allosaurus
- Anchisaurus
- Ankylosaurus
- Apatosaurus
- Archaeopteryx
- Bactrosaurus
- Bagaceratops (off-screen)
- Bambiraptor (off-screen)
- Barapasaurus (off-screen)
- Barosaurus
- Baryonyx
- Brachiosaurus
- Camarasaurus
- Camptosaurus (off-screen)
- Carcharodontosaurus (off-screen)
- Carnotaurus (off-screen)
- Centrosaurus
- Ceratosaurus
- Cetiosaurus (off-screen)
- Chasmosaurus
- Chindesaurus (off-screen)
- Chirostenotes (off-screen)
- Coelophysis
- Coelurus (off-screen)
- Compsognathus
- Corythosaurus
- Dacentrurus (off-screen)
- Daspletosaurus (off-screen)
- Deinocheirus (off-screen)
- Deinonychus
- Dilophosaurus
- Diplodocus
- Dravidosaurus
- Dromaeosaurus (off-screen)
- Dromiceiomimus
- Dryosaurus
- Dryptosaurus (off-screen)
- Echinodon (off-screen)
- Edmontonia (off-screen)
- Edmontosaurus
- Einiosaurus (off-screen)
- Elaphrosaurus (off-screen)
- Eoraptor (off-screen)
- Euhelopus (off-screen)
- Euoplocephalus
- Euskelosaurus (off-screen)
- Eustreptospondylus (off-screen)
- Fabrosaurus (off-screen)
- Gallimimus
- Garudimimus (off-screen)
- Gasosaurus (off-screen)
- Gastonia (off-screen)
- Giganotosaurus (off-screen)
- Gojirasaurus (off-screen)
- Gorgosaurus (off-screen)
- Gryposaurus (off-screen)
- Hadrosaurus (off-screen)
- Haplocanthosaurus (off-screen)
- Herrerasaurus
- Heterodontosaurus
- Homalocephale (off-screen)
- Huayangosaurus (off-screen)
- Hylaeosaurus (off-screen)
- Hypacrosaurus (off-screen)
- Hypsilophodon
- Iguanodon
- Kentrosaurus
- Kritosaurus (off-screen)
- Lambeosaurus (off-screen)
- Leaellynasaura
- Leptoceratops (off-screen)
- Lesothosaurus
- Lexovisaurus (off-screen)
- Liliensternus (off-screen)
- Lufengosaurus (off-screen)
- Maiasaura
- Mamenchisaurus
- Marshosaurus (off-screen)
- Massospondylus
- Megalosaurus
- Melanorosaurus (off-screen)
- Micropachycephalosaurus (off-screen)
- Microraptor (off-screen)
- Minmi
- Monoclonius (off-screen)
- Monolophosaurus (off-screen)
- Mononykus (off-screen)
- Montanoceratops (off-screen)
- Mussaurus
- Muttaburrasaurus
- Mymoorapelta (off-screen)
- Nodosaurus
- Omeisaurus (off-screen)
- Opisthocoelicaudia (off-screen)
- Ornitholestes
- Ornithomimus (off-screen)
- Ouranosaurus (off-screen)
- Oviraptor
- Pachycephalosaurus
- Parasaurolophus
- Parksosaurus (off-screen)
- Patagosaurus (off-screen)
- Pelecanimimus (off-screen)
- Pentaceratops (off-screen)
- Piatnitzkysaurus
- Pinacosaurus
- Plateosaurus
- Polacanthus
- Prenocephale (off-screen)
- Probactrosaurus (off-screen)
- Proceratosaurus (off-screen)
- Procompsognathus (off-screen)
- Protoceratops
- Psittacosaurus
- Rapetosaurus (off-screen)
- Rhabdodon (off-screen)
- Rhoetosaurus
- Riojasaurus (off-screen)
- Saltasaurus
- Saltopus
- Saurolophus
- Scelidosaurus
- Seismosaurus (off-screen)
- Shantungosaurus
- Shunosaurus (off-screen)
- Silvisaurus (off-screen)
- Spinosaurus
- Staurikosaurus
- Stegoceras (off-screen)
- Stegosaurus
- Struthiomimus
- Styracosaurus
- Supersaurus (off-screen)
- Talarurus (off-screen)
- Tarbosaurus
- Tenontosaurus (off-screen)
- Thecodontosaurus (off-screen)
- Therizinosaurus (off-screen)
- Thescelosaurus (off-screen)
- Titanosaurus (off-screen)
- Torosaurus (off-screen)
- Torvosaurus (off-screen)
- Triceratops
- Troodon
- Tsintaosaurus
- Tuojiangosaurus
- Tyrannosaurus rex
- Ultrasaurus (off-screen)
- Velociraptor
- Vulcanodon (off-screen)

=== Non-Dinosaurs ===
- Angustinaripterus (off-screen)
- Anurognathus (off-screen)
- Archelon
- Cearadactylus
- Ceresiosaurus (off-screen)
- Clidastes (off-screen)
- Cryptoclidus (off-screen)
- Cynognathus
- Deinosuchus
- Dimetrodon
- Dimorphodon
- Dsungaripterus (off-screen)
- Elasmosaurus
- Eryops
- Eudimorphodon
- Eurhinosaurus (off-screen)
- Excalibosaurus (off-screen)
- Futabasaurus (off-screen)
- Globidens (off-screen)
- Henodus (off-screen)
- Himalayasaurus (off-screen)
- Ichthyosaurus
- Kronosaurus
- Lariosaurus (off-screen)
- Leptonectes (off-screen)
- Liopleurodon (off-screen)
- Macroplata
- Metriorhynchus (off-screen)
- Mixosaurus (off-screen)
- Mosasaurus
- Moschops
- Muraenosaurus
- Nothosaurus (off-screen)
- Ophthalmosaurus (off-screen)
- Ornithocheirus (off-screen)
- Peloneustes
- Pistosaurus (off-screen)
- Platecarpus (off-screen)
- Plesiosaurus
- Pliosaurus (off-screen)
- Plotosaurus (off-screen)
- Postosuchus (off-screen)
- Protosuchus (off-screen)
- Pteranodon
- Pterodactylus
- Pterodaustro (off-screen)
- Quetzalcoatlus
- Rhamphorhynchus
- Rhomaleosaurus (off-screen)
- Santanadactylus (off-screen)
- Shonisaurus
- Sordes
- Tanystropheus (off-screen)
- Tapejara (off-screen)
- Temnodontosaurus (off-screen)
- Tylosaurus (off-screen)

== Critical reception ==
The Obscuritory felt the title "demonstrates how thoughtfully crafted reference material can bring value to information", adding that guided learning experiences such as this have value even in the age of Wikipedia. Compute! magazine thought the title was "highly entertaining and educational". PC Magazine deemed it instantly usable and a "visual delight", with "beautifully rendered illustrations and lots of text". PCWorld.pl felt the title was aesthetically perfect and extremely rich in substance. The Seattle Times thought its chief asset is its consistently challenging, informative content. An article at the Journal of Accountancy recalled a four-year-old child who, a few months after using the program, correctly identified the species of a dinosaur toy and pulled up the information in the game.

The game's sound effects won a multimedia industry award.
