= List of Microsoft Visual Studio add-ins =

The following is a list of notable Microsoft Visual Studio Add-ins. Add-ins are software products designed to be used in conjunction with and extend Microsoft Visual Studio. There are many versions of Microsoft Visual Studio, so some of these products may not be compatible with all versions of the product. Managed add-ins are typically found in the following location on Windows Vista and higher: C:\Users\{username}\Documents\Visual Studio {version}\Addins. COM-based add-ins can be installed anywhere as their directories are specified via the registry.

== IDE add-ins ==
=== Source control support ===
- AnkhSVN – Provides a free Subversion client for Visual Studio
- VisualSVN - Subversion integration for Visual Studio 2003–2026
- VsTortoise - A free TortoiseSVN add-in for Microsoft Visual Studio 2008/2010/2012/2013

=== Refactoring and productivity ===
- Visual Assist X - Productivity plugin, like Resharper. Notable for C++ support

=== Other ===
- PVS-Studio - Static Code Analyzer for C#, C, C++, C++11, C++/CX. Supports Visual Studio 2005/2008/2010/2012/2013/2015/2017.
- Designbox - Adds a toolbox that lets you associate initial property values with controls
- Koders – Adds a search plug-in to search the Koders database
- Reflector - a code browsing utility
- Dotfuscator – Provides tools to help prevent reverse engineering
- VSdocman - Visual Studio code commenter (XML doc comments) and API documentation generator. For VS 2010/2008/2005/2003/2002.
- XMLSpy – Integrates the XMLSpy IDE into Visual Studio for editing XML, XSLT, XSD, XQuery, XBRL, OOXML, etc.
- Liquid XML Studio – Integrates Liquid XML Tools: XML Schema Editor, WSDL Editor, XPath Expression Builder, and Web Services Test Client into Visual Studio 2005/2008/2010
- AWS Toolkit for Visual Studio Code

== Language add-ins ==
- Ada programming language
- ActionScript 3, for building Flash applications
- Boo programming language
- Eiffel programming language
- F# programming language
- Oxygene programming language
- Python Tools for Visual Studio
- PHP Tools for Visual Studio
