= Application Center Test =

Application Center Test (ACT) is a Microsoft load testing tool for web servers, focused on ASP.NET. It simulates numerous HTTP sessions from one machine. Using a bank of multiple computers, all firing off repeated HTTP requests, a significant load can be simulated. Tests can be written in either of the Microsoft scripting languages: VBScript and JScript. The tool can also be used for functional testing, although that is not what it is designed for. It also contains a recording function to create test cases without having to program them in.

Application Center Test was bundled with Visual Studio .NET 2003 Enterprise Architect and Enterprise Developer editions. Its main competitor is HP LoadRunner.

Application Center Test has been replaced with more powerful enterprise web application stress testing tools in Visual Studio 2005, specifically the Visual Studio 2005 Team Edition for Software Testers and the more recent Visual Studio Test Professional 2012
