= Creative Writer =

Word processor for children released in 1993

- Screenshot of the original Creative Writer.
- Developer: Microsoft
- Final release: 1.1 / 1995
- Operating system: Windows, Macintosh
- Successor: Creative Writer 2
- Available in: English, Spanish
- Type: Word processor
- License: Proprietary EULA

Creative Writer is a word processor released by Microsoft Kids in 1993. Using this program, which is specifically targeted at children, it is possible to create documents such as letters, posters, flyers and stories complete with different fonts, Clip art, WordArt and effects. The interface and environment are set in Imaginopolis with the main helper being a character known as McZee. A sequel, Creative Writer 2, was released in 1996. Both are now discontinued.

The original Creative Writer was announced by Microsoft on 7 December 1993 and was released in 1994. It ran on both MS-DOS 3.2 and the Windows 3.1 operating system. A version was also released for the Apple Macintosh, compatible with computers running the classic Mac OS from the System 6 version up to Mac OS 9.

The program took place in McZee's home of Imaginopolis and had several levels of a building each with a different topic (e.g. one for plain writing, one for story templates, one for poster templates). The design of the program was very similar to that of its sister program Fine Artist. The program runs full screen and creates an all-inclusive environment. The interface was similar to a later product called Microsoft Bob.

Creative Writer featured many of the features found on Microsoft's Word for Windows product, including the WordArt feature used to create titles and headlines and the ability to add clip art. Creative Writer also used sounds heavily where each tool would make a different noise. Examples of this include a vacuum cleaner suction to delete and an explosion to denote deleting everything from a page.

== File formats ==
Creative Writer and its sequel Creative Writer 2 both use different versions of the proprietary .max file format. This file format does not open in other word processors such as Word. Files created in Creative Writer can be viewed in Creative Writer 2 but files saved using Creative Writer 2 will not open correctly in Creative Writer. Creative Writer was also able to open .doc files kept in a location known as "Outside Of Imaginopolis".

== Expansion pack ==
An expansion pack, titled Ghostwriter Mysteries for Creative Writer, was released in 1994 by Microsoft Kids. It featured elements from the TV series Ghostwriter, including the show's team members and ten different mysteries to solve.

== See also ==
- Creative Writer 2
- Fine Artist
- Microsoft Home
