= ActiMates =

Series of interactive toys released by Microsoft Kids

ActiMates was a short-lived series of interactive robotic toys released by Microsoft Kids in September 1997. The toys are in the form of licensed character dolls which can interact with episodes of their respective television series from 1997 to 2000 or on special ActiMates-compatible VHS tapes and computer games. The toys were marketed as educational tools and gave positive affirmations for correct answers from the user.

== Characters ==
Microsoft released seven characters based on their three respective television series: Barney in 1997, Arthur, with his sister D.W. from the 1996 series in 1998 and the Teletubbies in 1999. Barney was the first to be released, was first displayed at the New York Toy Fair that year and became a success during the holiday season.

== Television and computer interaction ==
The dolls can interact with a television set and computer (the Teletubbies can't interact with the computer) using TV and PC packs. They can also be played standalone without the VCR, even with taped recordings on a blank VHS and computer packs. The barcode on the left side of the video frame and screen indicates that the show is ActiMates-compatible.

Three ActiMates Barney PC games released at launch, with more additional software to be released for Barney.

== Discontinuation ==
Microsoft discontinued the dolls in 2000 and lost the patent rights to the toys five years later.

However, despite the dolls and technology being discontinued in 2000, Teletubbies episodes were ActiMates-compatible up until 2001, the toys still interacted with reruns of their respective shows (from ActiMates-compatible years) during that time for a few more years, and Arthur and D.W. could still interact with Arthur VHS releases from 2000 to 2005 (releases that feature episodes from seasons 1-4). Barney could also interact with airings of seasons 4-6 of Barney & Friends on PBS Kids Sprout.
