= Microsoft AutoRoute =

Discontinued software by Microsoft

- Developer: Microsoft
- Final release: 2013
- Operating system: Windows XP and later
- Size: 3.13 GB
- Type: Route planning software
- License: Trialware
- Website: microsoft.com/en-gb/autoroute/

Microsoft AutoRoute is a discontinued travel planning program, and the European version of Microsoft Streets & Trips. It covers the United Kingdom and all of Europe, including European Russia, as well as Armenia, Azerbaijan, Georgia, Cyprus and all of Turkey. AutoRoute was produced in several European languages besides English, and in two separate editions: AutoRoute and AutoRoute GPS.

== History ==
Microsoft AutoRoute was originally based on Automap, route planning software created by British software company NextBase Limited. NextBase was founded by five friends working from a house in Esher, England, before eventually moving to Unit 18 at the Staines Central Trading Estate, Staines and then moving to and office/warehouse block in Ashford, Middlesex. NextBase's first product was AutoRoute, which launched in 1988, and was eventually followed by AutoRoute Plus, MapBase, NextBase World Explorer, MapVision, Automap Road Atlas, Automap Streets and Automap Pro.

== AutoRoute ==
As Microsoft states, AutoRoute was "customisable travel planning software that helps you get accurate directions, easily explore new areas and find the services you want and need along the way. You can create journey schedules, and drag and drop part of a route onto another section of road to create a detour. Points of interest are easy to browse and add to your journey. On or off-line, AutoRoute gives you detailed door to door directions and more than 5 million miles of navigable roads and motorways throughout Europe at your fingertips." The software covered 37 countries in Eastern and Western Europe.

== AutoRoute GPS ==
This version "includes the same software and functionality as AutoRoute, but adds a sleek, compact GPS receiver so you can plan your journey and track your location in real-time. AutoRoute with GPS Locator has many trip planning tools plus updated maps, so you'll always know exactly where you are and where to turn next."
