= Fine Artist =

Raster graphics editor software

- Developers: Turning Point Software; Microsoft Kids
- Release: January 1994; 32 years ago
- Operating system: Microsoft Windows; System 7
- Type: Raster graphics editor
- License: Proprietary

Fine Artist is a raster graphics editor published by Microsoft under their Microsoft Kids portfolio. The editor allows the user to create paintings using a variety of brushes and stamps. The interface and environment is especially targeted towards children and is set in Imaginopolis, with a character named McZee acting as a virtual assistant. The editor's interface uses levels of a building as a visual metaphor each of the software's different features (e.g. one for creating new images, one as a gallery of existing images). The design of the program was very similar to that of its sister program Creative Writer, which was a word processor. The program runs exclusively in full screen, creating an all-inclusive environment.

Fine Artist was designed and developed primarily by Turning Point Software in collaboration with Microsoft. It was announced by Microsoft in December 1993 alongside Creative Writer. It was released in January 1994 for both the PC and the Mac, requiring at minimum Windows 3.1 (for the PC) and System 7 (for the Mac). Microsoft discontinued it in 1997.

Fine Artist is considerably more powerful than Microsoft Paint, as it includes over 500 pieces of clip art (refereed to as "stickers" in the game), 50 of which are animated; 72 paintbrush styles; 76 assignable colors and patterns; and 87 predrawn backgrounds. It also has the ability to assign sound effects (from a library of 300) to any point on the painting. The sound effect can be activated by click on said point with the "magic wand" tool. The software also generates sounds whenever the user clicks any of the tools.

== See also ==
- Microsoft Home
- Creative Writer
- 3D Movie Maker
