= Encarta =

1993–2009 digital multimedia encyclopedia

Microsoft Encarta

- Encarta Premium 2009 on Windows 10
- Developer: Microsoft
- Final release: 2009 / August 23, 2008; 18 years ago
- Operating system: Microsoft Windows, MacOS Classic
- Available in: English, German, French, Spanish, Portuguese, Italian, Dutch, Japanese
- Type: Encyclopedia
- License: Proprietary commercial software
- Website: encarta.msn.com at the Wayback Machine (archived 2001-01-05)

Microsoft Encarta is a discontinued digital multimedia encyclopedia and search engine published by Microsoft from 1993 to 2009. Originally sold on CD-ROM or DVD, it was also available online via annual subscription, although later articles could also be viewed for free online with advertisements. By 2008, the complete English version, Encarta Premium, consisted of more than 62,000 articles, numerous photos and illustrations, music clips, videos, interactive content, timelines, maps, atlases and homework tools.

Microsoft published similar encyclopedias under the Encarta trademark in various languages, including German, French, Spanish, Dutch, Italian, Portuguese and Japanese. Localized versions contained contents licensed from national sources and different amounts of content than the full English version. For example, the Dutch-language version had content from the Dutch Winkler Prins encyclopedia.

In March 2009, Microsoft announced it was discontinuing both the Encarta disc and online versions. The MSN Encarta site was closed on October 31, 2009, in all countries except Japan, where it was closed on December 31, 2009. Microsoft continued to operate the Encarta online dictionary until 2011.

== History ==
=== Background ===
In 1985, Microsoft attempted to establish a partnership with Encyclopædia Britannica to create a CD-ROM version of their publication. Since their management felt it would not fit in with their traditional print-based offerings, Britannica rejected Microsoft's offer. By 1989, the software company struck a non-exclusive rights deal with the publishers of the Funk & Wagnalls Encyclopedia, and considered a rewrite of the material. Following the successes of Compton's Multimedia Encyclopedia (1989; published by Britannica) and The New Grolier Multimedia Encyclopedia (1992), Microsoft initiated their multimedia-encyclopedia project under the internal codename "Gandalf".

=== Launch ===
In 1993, "Gandalf" was officially launched as Encarta; the name was created for Microsoft by an advertising agency. Encarta cost $395 upon release, although it soon dropped to $99, and was often bundled into the price of a new computer purchase. The text of Funk & Wagnalls served as the basis of its first edition; Funk & Wagnalls continued to publish revised editions for several years independently of Encarta, but ceased printing in the late 1990s.

Later that decade, Microsoft added content from Collier's Encyclopedia and New Merit Scholar's Encyclopedia from Macmillan into Encarta after purchasing them. Thus the final Microsoft Encarta can be considered the successor of the Funk and Wagnalls, Collier, and New Merit Scholar encyclopedias. None of these formerly successful encyclopedias remained in print for long after being merged into Encarta.

Microsoft introduced several regional versions of Encarta localized for international markets. For example, the Brazilian Portuguese version was introduced in 1999 and suspended in 2002. The Spanish version was somewhat smaller than the English one, at 42,000 articles.

=== Move to the web and demise ===
In 2000, the full Encarta content became available on the World Wide Web to subscribers, with a subset available for free to anyone. In 2006, Websters Multimedia, a Bellevue, Washington subsidiary of London-based Websters International Publishers, took over maintenance of Encarta from Microsoft. The last version was Encarta Premium 2009, released in August 2008.

Microsoft announced in April 2009 that it would cease to sell Microsoft Student and all editions of Encarta Premium software products worldwide by June 2009, citing changes in the way people seek information, and in the traditional encyclopedia and reference material market, as the key reasons behind the termination. Updates for Encarta were offered until October 2009. Additionally, MSN Encarta web sites were discontinued around October 31, 2009, with the exception of Encarta Japan which was discontinued on December 31, 2009. Existing MSN Encarta Premium (part of MSN Premium) subscribers were refunded.

The demise of Encarta was widely attributed to competition from the free and user-generated Wikipedia, which grew to be larger than Encarta from its early beginnings in 2001 due to the popularization by web search services like Google.

== Contents and features ==
Encarta's standard edition included approximately 50,000 articles, with additional images, videos and sounds. The premium editions contained over 62,000 articles and other multimedia content, such as 25,000 pictures and illustrations, over 300 videos and animations, and an interactive atlas with 1.8 million locations. Its articles were integrated with multimedia content and could include links to websites selected by its editors. Encarta's articles in general were less lengthy and more summarized than the printed version of Encyclopædia Britannica or the online Wikipedia. Like most multimedia encyclopedias, Encarta's articles tended to provide an overview of the subject rather than an exhaustive coverage and can only be viewed one at a time.

A sidebar could display alternative views, essays, journals or original materials relevant to the topic. For example, when reading about computers, it featured annals since 1967 of the computer industry. Encarta also supported closed captioning for the hearing impaired. A separate program, called Encarta Research Organizer was included in early versions for gathering and organizing information and constructing a Word document-based report. Later versions included Encarta Researcher, a browser plugin to organize information from Encarta articles and web pages into research projects. Content copied from Encarta was appended with a copyright boilerplate message after the selection. The user interface allowed for viewing content with only images, videos, sounds, animations, 360-degree views, virtual tours, charts and tables or only interactives.

Encarta was originally available for sale on 1–5 CD-ROMs or a DVD-ROM. Some new PCs were shipped with an OEM edition of Encarta.

Encarta 2000 and later had "Map Treks", which were tours of geographic features and concepts. Microsoft also had for a brief period a separate product known as Encarta Africana which was an encyclopedia of black history and culture. Starting with the 2001 version, it was integrated into the main Encarta Reference Suite. Encarta 2002 and onward featured 3D Virtual Tours of ancient structures, for example the Acropolis; 2D panoramic images of world wonders or major cities; and a virtual flight feature which allowed users to fly a virtual airplane over a coarsely generated artificial landscape area. Version 2002 also introduced the ability to install the entire encyclopedia locally to the hard disk drive to prevent frequent swapping of discs, and it updated far more often than its predecessors, with a rate of nearly 3–4 updates per week compared to the monthly updates that were used in prior versions of Encarta.

Encarta 2003 incorporated literature guides and book summaries, foreign language translation dictionaries, a Homework Center and Chart Maker. Encarta's Visual Browser, available since the 2004 version, presented a user with a list of related topics making them more discoverable. A collection of 32 Discovery Channel videos were also later added. Encarta 2005 introduced another program called Encarta Kids aimed at children to make learning fun.

Encarta also included a trivia game called MindMaze (accessible through Ctrl+Z) in which the player explores a castle by answering questions whose answers can be found in the encyclopedia's articles. There was also a "Geography Quiz" and several other games and quizzes, some quizzes also in Encarta Kids.

Until 2005, Encarta came in three primary software editions: Standard, Deluxe, and Reference Library (called Reference Suite until Encarta 2002) (price and features in that order). Beginning with Encarta 2006, however, when Websters Multimedia took over its maintenance, Encarta became a feature of Microsoft Student. Although it was possible to purchase only the Encarta encyclopedia separately, Microsoft Student bundles together Encarta Premium with Microsoft Math (a graphing-calculator program) and Learning Essentials, an add-in which provides templates for Microsoft Office. In addition, the Deluxe and Reference Library editions were discontinued: absorbed into a new, more comprehensive Premium package. Encarta's user interface was shared with Microsoft Student, and was streamlined to reduce clutter with only a Search box which returned relevant results. However, it became no longer possible to simply browse all the encyclopedia articles alphabetically.

=== World Atlas ===
The dynamic maps were generated with the same engine that powered Microsoft MapPoint software. The map was a virtual globe that one could freely rotate and magnify to any location down to major streets for big cities. The globe had multiple surfaces displaying political boundaries, physical landmarks, historical maps and statistical information. One could selectively display statistical values on the globe surface or in a tabular form, different sized cities, various geological or human-made features and reference lines in a map.

The maps contained hyperlinks to related articles ("Map Trek") and also supported a "Dynamic Sensor" that provides the latitude, longitude, place name, population and local time for any point on the globe. Encarta also generated a visible-light moon atlas with names of major craters and hyperlinks. However, it did not include a planetarium, but instead had a small interactive constellation-only map.

In addition to database generated maps, many other illustrative maps in Encarta ("Historical Maps") were drawn by artists. Some more advanced maps were interactive: for example, the large African map for Africana could display information such as political boundaries or the distribution of African flora.

=== Criticism of regional variations ===
Robert McHenry, while Editor-in-Chief of the Encyclopædia Britannica, criticized Encarta for differences in factual content between national versions of Encarta, accusing Microsoft of "pandering to local prejudices" instead of presenting subjects objectively. An article written by Bill Gates addressed the nature of writing encyclopedias for different regions.

== Technology ==
Before the emergence of the World Wide Web for information browsing, Microsoft recognized the importance of having an engine that supported a multimedia markup language, full text search, and extensibility using software objects. The hypertext display, hyperlinking and search software was created by a team of CD-ROM Division developers in the late 1980s who designed it as a generalized engine for uses as diverse as interactive help, document management systems and as ambitious as a multimedia encyclopedia.

Encarta was able to use various Microsoft technologies because it was extensible with software components for displaying unique types of multimedia information. For example, a snap in map engine is adapted from its MapPoint software. The hypertext and search engine used by Encarta also powered Microsoft Bookshelf.

Encarta used database technologies to generate much of its multimedia content. For example, Encarta generated each zoomable map from a global geographic information system database on demand.

When a user used the copy and paste function of Microsoft Windows on Encarta on more than five words, Encarta automatically appended a copyright boilerplate message after the paste.

=== User editing ===
Early in 2005, Encarta's editor-in-chief at the time, Gary Alt, announced that the online Encarta started to allow users to suggest changes to existing articles.

=== Chatbot ===
Encarta's content was accessible using a conversational interface on Windows Live Messenger via the MSN Bot "Encarta Instant Answers". The bot could answer many encyclopedia related questions directly in the IM window. It used short sentences from the Encarta website, and sometimes displays full articles in the Internet Explorer-based browser on the right. It also could complete simple mathematical and advanced algebra problems. This service was also available in German, Spanish, French and Japanese.

=== Updates ===
Each summer Microsoft published a new version of Encarta. However, despite the inclusion of news-related and some supplementary articles, Encarta's contents had not been changed substantially in its later years. Besides the yearly update, the installed offline copy could be updated over the Internet for a certain period for free depending on the edition. Some articles (usually about 2,000) were updated to reflect important changes or events. When the update period expired, an advertisement prompting to upgrade to the new version was displayed to the user occasionally.

== Reception ==
The editors of PC Gamer US nominated Microsoft Encarta '95 for their 1994 "Best Educational Product" award, although it lost to the CD-ROM adaptation of The Way Things Work.

== See also ==
- Lists of encyclopedias
- List of online encyclopedias
- List of encyclopedias by branch of knowledge
- List of encyclopedias by language (English)
- List of historical encyclopedias
- Microsoft Music Central
- Reference software
- Encyclopædia Britannica Ultimate Reference Suite
