= Microsoft Cinemania =

Film database released annually by Microsoft between 1992 and 1997

- Welcome article of a Cinemania 97 CD, alongside an index window on the left
- Developer: Microsoft
- Initial release: 1992; 34 years ago
- Final release: 97 / August 1997; 28 years ago
- Operating system: Microsoft Windows, Classic Mac OS
- Successor: Cinemania Online
- Available in: English
- Type: Reference work, encyclopedia
- License: Proprietary
- Website: Cinemania Online at the Wayback Machine (archived April 20, 1998)

Microsoft Cinemania was an interactive movie guide as part of the Microsoft Home series of reference and educational multimedia application CD-ROM titles produced by Microsoft and published annually from 1992 up until 1997.

== History ==
The software was available for both Windows and Macintosh. Early versions for Windows were 16-bit, Cinemania 96 had both 16-bit and 32-bit EXEs for compatibility with Windows 3.1 and native Windows 95 support respectively. The last edition of Cinemania was released in 1997 and is the only purely 32-bit version. This version was supported on Windows 95 or Windows NT, or Apple Macintoshes running System 7. Melinda Gates, ex-wife of Bill Gates, worked on the development of this software in the early 1990s.

== Content ==
The software was mainly a database of films, in a similar fashion to the Internet Movie Database, and gave descriptions of the films and who starred in them. Most of this information was not readily accessible before broadband internet.

Cinemania contained professional material by:

- Leonard Maltin: 19,000 reviews from his Movie and Video Guide
- Roger Ebert: over 1300 reviews from his Video Companion (starting from the 2nd edition, published as Cinemania '94)
- Pauline Kael: 2500 reviews from her 5001 Nights at the movies book (also starting with Cinemania '94)
- Baseline: The Motion Picture Guide and The Encyclopedia of Film
- James Monaco: How to Read a Film
- Ephraim Katz: The Film Encyclopedia

The program also included over 2000 still images for movies and actors, a large number of sound clips, dialogues and soundtracks, and a smaller selection of full-motion video clips. As the amount of material increased with each new edition, the quality of media tended to decrease, in order to fit everything on a single CD-ROM. Cinemania 97 also had guided tours from numerous celebrities and online features which made use of an associated MSN website. It could be updated monthly over the Internet, which brought new movies, new material about older movies and new celebrity tours.

== Reception ==
PC Magazine in 1993 said that Cinemania 1994 was "the ultimate movie buff's guide to the cinema ... the most complete CD-ROM movie guide available".
