= Ric Weiland =

American computer software pioneer and philanthropist

Richard William "Ric" Weiland
- Weiland in the 1970s
- Born: April 21, 1953
- Died: June 24, 2006 (aged 53)

Richard William "Ric" Weiland (April 21, 1953 – June 24, 2006) was a software developer, programmer, and philanthropist. He was the second employee at Microsoft Corporation, joining the company during his final year at Stanford University in Stanford, California. At 35, he left Microsoft focusing on working in investment management and philanthropy. He was a quiet but well-respected donor to the LGBTQ social justice movement, the environment, health and human services, and education. After his death, the Chronicle of Philanthropy said Weiland had given the 11th largest charitable amount in the nation with more than $165 million distributed between 20 nonprofit beneficiaries.

== Early life ==
Weiland was a high-school classmate and friend of Paul Allen. They created the Lakeside Programmers Group at Lakeside School, a preparatory school in Seattle. Weiland, Allen, Bill Gates, and Gates' childhood best friend Kent Evans were involved with the Computer Center Corporation working with a PDP-10. They created a payroll program in COBOL for a company in Portland, Oregon and wrote scheduling software for Lakeside School.

== Microsoft ==
Allen and Gates hired Weiland in 1975, the same year they founded Microsoft in Albuquerque. As one of only five employees, Weiland was a lead programmer and developer for the company's BASIC and COBOL language systems. After a couple of semesters at Harvard Business School in Cambridge, Massachusetts, in 1976–77, he rejoined Microsoft becoming the project leader for Microsoft Works. Allen said Weiland was a "brilliant programmer" and a key contributor to the company's success.

== Philanthropy ==
Weiland was a donor to more than 60 nonprofit organizations and distributed an estimated $21.5 million, primarily between 1996 and 2006. His largest gift was to establish an endowed chair in his mother's name at Stanford-the Martha Meier Weiland professorship in the School of Medicine. He was influential as an active member of the Northwest gay community. While a volunteer on the Pride Foundation's board of directors from 1997 to 2001, he helped win the fight to get General Electric to include sexual orientation in their non-discrimination policy. A member of the national GLSEN board (an organization focused on supporting gay-straight alliances in schools across the country) from 2002 to 2005, he was a fervent supporter of programs promoting safe schools.

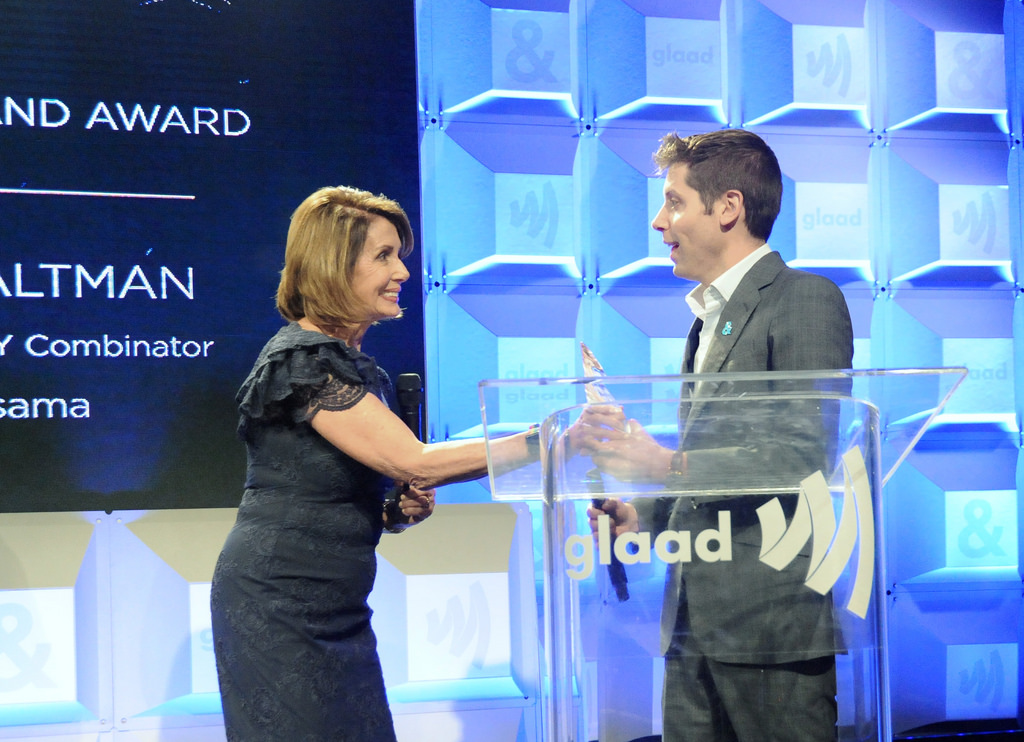
Nancy Pelosi presents the Ric Weiland Award at GLAAD 2017.

Ten LGBTQ/AIDS organizations benefited from a donor advised fund Weiland established through the Pride Foundation at his death. More than $56 million was distributed between 2007 and 2017 to the organizations. For most of the nonprofits it was the largest gift in their history. Beneficiaries included: Lambda Legal, GLSEN, GLAAD, amFAR, the Task Force, OutRight Action International, PFLAG, Project Inform, In the Life Media, and OutServe.

Eight other estate beneficiaries received endowment gifts including United Way of King County, the Fred Hutchinson Cancer Center, Seattle Children's Hospital, Lakeside School, Pride Foundation, and three environmental organizations-the Sierra Club, the Environmental Defense Fund and the National Wildlife Federation. The Nature Conservancy received two direct gifts of $6.4 million each-one to support programs in Washington State and another supporting their global environmental work.

In 2007, Weiland's $54 million gift to Stanford was called the largest bequest since the Stanford family's founding grant. At the university, 12 endowed Weiland funds have been established, with a focus on supporting undergraduate scholarships and graduate fellowships. More than 175 PhD students in over 30 fields of study have received Weiland fellowships, making it the largest fellowship program on campus. There are also five endowed Weiland chairs, the Martha Meier Weiland professorship at the Stanford University School of Medicine, the William Hershel Weiland professorship in physics honoring his father, and three Richard William Weiland chairs in the School of Engineering. Weiland funds support the Stanford LGBTQ community through the university's first endowment to Student Affairs, undergraduate education, the School of Business, the Center for Social Innovation and the university's general endowment. The permanent endowment funds established through Weiland's estate have a 2017 value of more than $150 million and generate approximately $7.5 million per year in program support.

== Death ==
Weiland died by suicide by gunshot on June 24, 2006. Besides his longstanding HIV diagnosis, he was reported to have suffered from clinical depression. Survivors include his partner Mike Schaefer as well as two nieces and two nephews in Oregon and Washington. Weiland is the subject of Aaron Bear's eponymous documentary Yes I Am: The Ric Weiland Story. Narrated by Zachary Quinto, featuring Bill Gates and co-produced by Fenton Bailey, Randy Barbato, and Wes Hurley, the film won the Special Recognition Award at the 2024 GLAAD Media Awards.

== See also ==
- History of Microsoft
