= Bob O'Rear =

Microsoft employee

Robert O'Rear is a former director of international sales and marketing of Microsoft, and is among the group of eleven early Microsoft employees who posed for a company photo taken in Albuquerque in 1978. A Texan, he has degrees in mathematics and physics. He left Microsoft in 1993, and reportedly owns a cattle ranch in Texas.

== Early life ==
O'Rear, born in Wellington, Texas, was brought up in Perryton, a rural town of 3,500 people in the Texas Panhandle by his grandparents, who were sharecroppers on a cotton farm. O'Rear planned to be a physical education teacher, but later ended up graduating from the University of Texas at El Paso with a bachelor's degree in mathematics. He went on to graduate school at the University of Texas at Austin to study mathematics and astrophysics.

In 1966, TRW in Redondo Beach hired O'Rear to work on Air Force spy satellite programs. He also wrote programs that optimized the trajectory of Minuteman missiles during the Cold War. Later on, in the 1960s, he went to work for NASA. He helped write a program that determined the trajectory of the Apollo Command Module as it reentered the Earth's atmosphere, and was in the NASA Command Center when Neil Armstrong landed on the Moon.

Later in the 1970s, O'Rear and a friend from his TRW days founded a company called Texametrics that made automated machinery for the manufacturing of polyurethane bottle caps. O'Rear worked on a program that analyzed the patterns of correctly manufactured caps and caused the incorrectly manufactured parts to be ejected. During this time, O'Rear worked with both hardware and software that helped him later when he joined Microsoft.

== Microsoft ==
O'Rear first joined Microsoft in 1977 and became the seventh employee. He went to work as the company's chief mathematician and project manager . He learned how programs were put together and also reworked some of the math code in them. After the success of the MS-DOS and the IBM PC, O'Rear became the director of international sales and marketing.

=== IBM PC and MS-DOS ===
Microsoft entered an agreement with Seattle Computer Products to acquire marketing rights for 86-DOS, which had been built to work on the Intel 8086 and so would work on the IBM PC's Intel 8088 since the chips were binary compatible.

Work then began as soon as the first prototype of the IBM PC was received in Thanksgiving of 1980, and O'Rear was assigned both project lead and sole programmer. Despite difficulties with both hardware and software (and some communication delays with IBM), O'Rear produced PC DOS v1.0 in August 1981. The boot sector of the PC DOS v1.0 floppy disk even bears his name, instead of the 'Microsoft Inc' text of subsequent versions.

The success of MS-DOS and IBM's branding of it (PC DOS) made Microsoft a Fortune 500 company.

== Retirement ==
O'Rear retired from Microsoft in 1993. O'Rear started a ranch in the Texas Panhandle where he grew up with his brother. While O'Rear provides the financing and business structure, his brother runs and operates the ranch. He spends more time with his family and pursues his hobbies, including golf, racquetball, and skiing. O'Rear is also a director on several boards of local businesses and invests in real estate development. Just before his retirement, he joined the advisory council on the College of Natural Sciences at the University of Texas at El Paso, his alma mater, through which he keeps a working relationship between the university and Microsoft by encouraging recruit students from the university.

== See also ==
- History of Microsoft

== Bibliography ==
- Tsang, Cheryl D. Microsoft First Generation. Canada: John Wiley & Sons inc., 2000.
