= Yes I Am (film) =

2021 documentary film by Aaron Bear

Yes I Am – The Ric Weiland Story
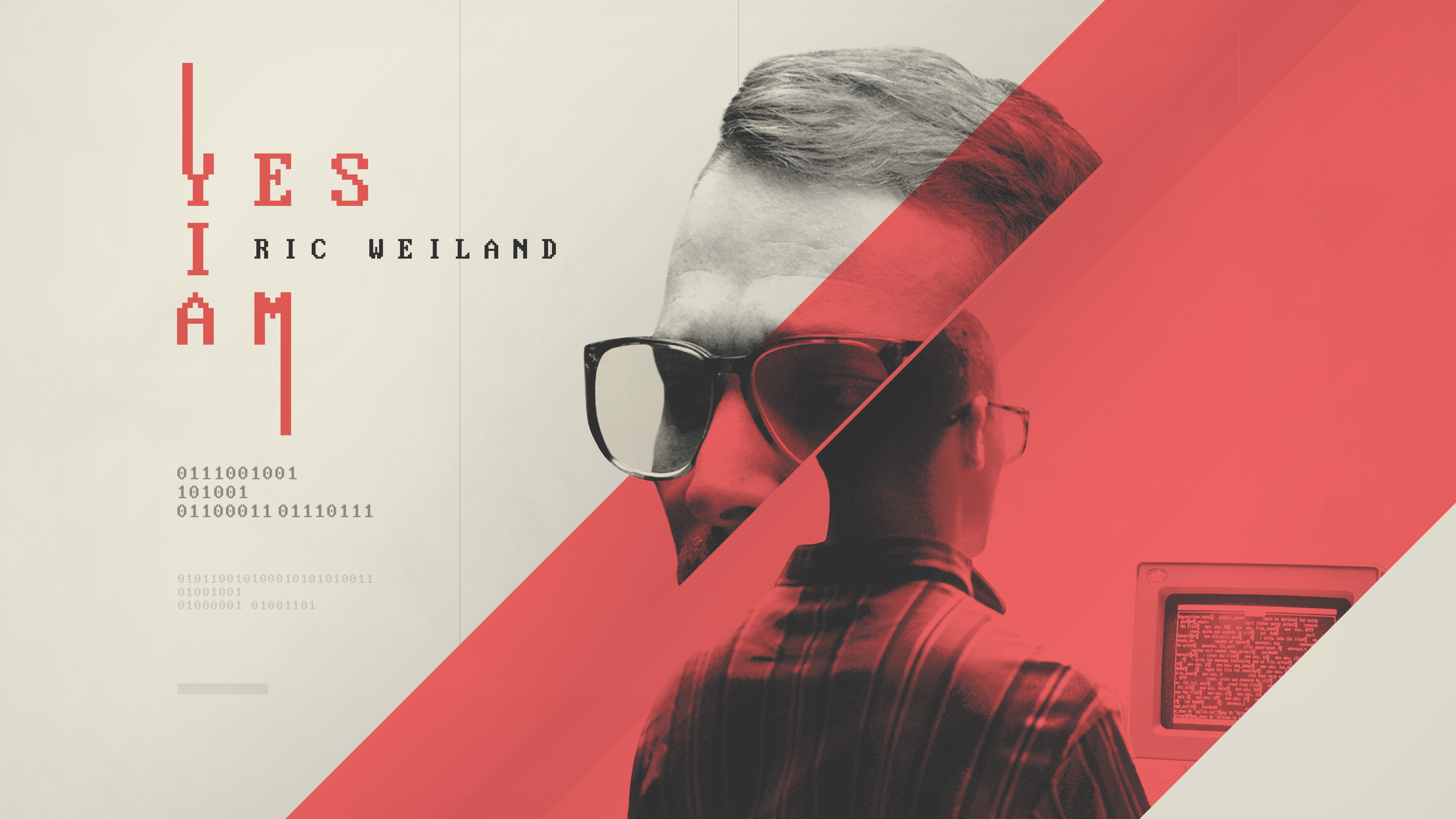
- Festival poster
- Directed by: Aaron Bear
- Produced by: Aaron Bear; Fenton Bailey; Randy Barbato
- Starring: Bill Gates; Mike Schaefer; Gil Bar-Sela; Urvashi Vaid
- Narrated by: Zachary Quinto
- Edited by: Celia Beasley; Stephen Michael Simon
- Music by: Taylor Delph
- Production company: World of Wonder Productions
- Distributed by: Kino Lorber (Home media); WOW Presents Plus (streaming)
- Release date: 2021
- Running time: 62 minutes
- Country: United States
- Language: English

Yes I Am – The Ric Weiland Story is a 2021 American documentary film directed by Aaron Bear. Narrated by actor Zachary Quinto, the film profiles Microsoft co-founder and philanthropist Ric Weiland, tracing his innovations in early personal-computer software, his substantial LGBTQ and HIV/AIDS philanthropy, and his long-private struggle with depression. The picture premiered at the 2021 Provincetown International Film Festival and later screened at Mountainfilm, Inside Out Toronto, and more than a dozen other LGBTQ or documentary events. In 2024 the documentary received a Special Recognition Award at the 35th GLAAD Media Awards.

== Synopsis ==
Through archival footage and first-person interviews with colleagues such as Bill Gates, the film charts Weiland's trajectory from prodigious Lakeside School programmer to Microsoft's second employee. It documents his decision to leave the company in 1988, his subsequent donations exceeding US$200 million to LGBTQ, environmental, and health charities, and his death by suicide in 2006. The narrative juxtaposes Weiland's public generosity with private journals that reveal impostor-syndrome and HIV-related depression, framing his legacy within the broader history of queer visibility in tech.

== Production ==
Director Aaron Bear began principal photography in 2016 after securing the cooperation of Weiland's partner Mike Schaefer and the trustees of the Weiland estate. World of Wonder founders Fenton Bailey and Randy Barbato boarded the project as executive producers, bringing financing and post-production resources. Filming spanned Seattle, Silicon Valley, and New York City, with interviews that include Bill Gates and Urvashi Vaid, extensive personal diaries, photographs, and never before seen photos of Microsoft during its infancy. Ric's diaries were digitized at Stanford University Libraries' Special Collections.

== Release ==
=== Festival circuit ===
The film debuted at the 2021 Provincetown International Film Festival followed by Mountainfilm (Telluride), OUTshine (Miami), Inside Out (Toronto), and the Palm Springs Cinema Diverse festival.

=== Home media and streaming ===
Kino Lorber issued the documentary on region-A DVDs on June 13, 2023. WOW Presents Plus acquired worldwide VOD rights later that year, making the title available for streaming from November 15, 2023.

== Reception ==
Critics praised the film's blend of tech history and queer biography.

- Bay Area Reporter called it "an essential corrective to Silicon Valley lore" and commended its frank treatment of mental health.
- The Arts STL noted that "by letting Weiland narrate his own journals, the documentary sidesteps hagiography."

=== Awards ===
Year	Award / Festival	Category	Result
2021	Inside Out Toronto LGBT Film Festival	Documentary Feature	Official Selection
2021	OUTshine Film Festival (Miami)	Audience Award – Documentary	Won
2021	Dumbo Film Festival	Best Documentary Feature	Won
2024	GLAAD Media Awards (35th)	Special Recognition Award	Won

== Legacy and impact ==
Since release, the film has been used by LGBTQ nonprofits, including GLSEN and Lambda Legal, as a fundraising and educational tool; screenings on World AIDS Day 2023 were paired with mental-health panels in Seattle and Ventura County, California. Stanford Libraries cited the documentary as a catalyst for its 2024 digital exhibit on the Ric Weiland papers, crediting the film with renewed scholarly interest in early queer tech history.
