= History of Microsoft Word =

Installation floppy of Microsoft Word for UNIX Systems, version 5.0 (distributed by SCO, 1990)

The first version of Microsoft Word was developed by Charles Simonyi and Richard Brodie, former Xerox programmers hired by Bill Gates and Paul Allen in 1981. Both programmers worked on Xerox Bravo, the first WYSIWYG (What You See Is What You Get) word processor. The first Word version, Word 1.0, was released in October 1983 for Xenix, MS-DOS, and IBM; it was followed by four very similar versions that were not very successful. The first Windows version was released in 1989, with a slightly improved interface. When Windows 3.0 was released in 1990, Word became a huge commercial success. Word for Windows 1.0 was followed by Word 2.0 in 1991 and Word 6.0 in 1993. Then it was renamed to Word 95 and Word 97, Word 2000 and Word for Office XP (to follow Windows commercial names). With the release of Word 2003, the numbering was again year-based. Since then, Word versions include Word 2007, Word 2010, Word 2013, Word 2016, and most recently, Word for Office 365.

In 1986, an agreement between Atari and Microsoft brought Word to the Atari ST. The Atari ST version was a translation of Word 1.05 for the Apple Macintosh; however, it was released under the name Microsoft Write (the name of the word processor included with Windows during the 1980s and early 1990s). Unlike other versions of Word, the Atari version was a one-time release with no future updates or revisions. The release of Microsoft Write in 1988 was one of two major PC applications to be released for the Atari ST (the other application being WordPerfect).

In 2014, the source code for Word for Windows version 1.1a was made available to the Computer History Museum and the public for educational purposes.

== Word for DOS ==
The first Microsoft Word was released in 1983 as Multi-Tool Word at the same time as the first Microsoft Mouse. Costing $395, it featured graphics video mode and mouse support in a WYSIWYG interface. It could run in text mode or graphics mode but the visual difference between the two was minor. In graphics mode, the document and interface were rendered in a fixed font size monospace character grid with italic, bold and underline features that were not available in text mode. It had support for style sheets in separate files (.STY).

The first version of Word was a 16-bit PC DOS/MS-DOS application. A Macintosh 68000 version named Word 1.0 was released in 1985 and a Microsoft Windows version was released in 1989. The three products shared the same Microsoft Word name, the same version numbers but were very different products built on different code bases. Three product lines co-existed: Word 1.0 to Word 5.1a for Macintosh, Word 1.0 to Word 2.0 for Windows and Word 1.0 to Word 5.5 for DOS.

Word 1.1 for DOS was released in 1984 and added the Print Merge support, equivalent to the Mail Merge feature in newer Word systems.

Word 2.0 for DOS was released in 1985 and featured Extended Graphics Adapter (EGA) support.

Word 3.0 for DOS was released in 1986.

Word 4.0 for DOS was released in 1987 and added support for revision marks (equivalent to the Track Changes feature in more recent Word versions), search/replace by style and macros stored as keystroke sequences. Computer Intelligence estimated that year that Microsoft had 4% of the Fortune 1000 PC word processor market. By 1988 Word and WordPerfect were the two leading word processors, each competing with the other in frequently adding features and lowering prices, and with significantly more market shares than DisplayWrite 4 and MultiMate.

Word 5.0 for DOS, released in 1989, added support for bookmarks, cross-references and conditions and loops in macros, remaining backwards compatible with Word 3.0 macros. The macro language differed from the WinWord 1.0 WordBasic macro language.

Word 5.5 for DOS, released in 1990, significantly changed the user interface, with popup menus and dialog boxes. Even in graphics mode, these graphical user interface (GUI) elements got the monospace ASCII art look and feel found in text mode programs like Microsoft QuickBasic.

Word 6.0 for DOS, the last Word for DOS version, was released in 1993, at the same time as Word 6.0 for Windows (16-bit) and Word 6.0 for Macintosh. Although Macintosh and Windows versions shared the same code base, the Word for DOS was different. The Word 6.0 for DOS macro language was compatible with the Word 3.x-5.x macro language while Word 6.0 for Windows and Word 6.0 for Macintosh inherited WordBasic from the Word 1.0/2.0 for Windows code base. The DOS and Windows versions of Word 6.0 had different file formats.

== Word for Windows 1989 to 1995 ==
The first version of Word for Windows was released in November 1989 at a price of USD $498, but was not very popular as Windows users still comprised a minority of the market. The next year, Windows 3.0 debuted, followed shortly afterwards by WinWord 1.1, which was updated for the new OS. The failure of WordPerfect to produce a Windows version proved a fatal mistake. The following year, in 1991, WinWord 2.0 was released which had further improvements and finally solidified Word's marketplace dominance. WinWord 6.0 came out in 1993 and was designed for the newly released Windows 3.1. By 1991 Word had more than half of the Windows word processor market, more than twice WordPerfect's share.

The early versions of Word also included copy protection mechanisms that tried to detect debuggers, and if one was found, it produced the message "The tree of evil bears bitter fruit. Only the Shadow knows. Now trashing program disk." and performed a zero seek on the floppy disk (but did not delete its contents).

After MacWrite, Word for Macintosh never had any serious rivals, although programs such as Nisus Writer provided features such as non-continuous selection, which were not added until Word 2002 in Office XP. Word 5.1 for the Macintosh, released in 1992, was a very popular word processor, owing to its elegance, relative ease of use and feature set. However, version 6.0 for the Macintosh, released in 1994, was widely derided, unlike the Windows version. It was the first version of Word based on a common code base between the Windows and Mac versions; many accused the Mac version of being slow, clumsy and memory intensive.

The Windows and Macintosh Word development teams merged after Word for Windows 2.0. With the release of Word 6.0 in 1993 Microsoft again attempted to synchronize the version numbers and coordinate product naming across platforms; this time across the three versions for DOS, Macintosh, and Windows (where the previous version was Word for Windows 2.0). There may have also been thought given to matching the current version 6.0 of WordPerfect for DOS and Windows, Word's major competitor. However, this wound up being the last version of Word for DOS. In addition, subsequent versions of Word were no longer referred to by version number, and were instead named after the year of their release (e.g. Word 95 for Windows, synchronizing its name with Windows 95, and Word 98 for Macintosh), once again breaking the synchronization.

When Microsoft became aware of the Year 2000 problem, it released the entire DOS port of Microsoft Word 5.5 instead of getting people to pay for the update. As of October 2026, it is still available for download from Microsoft's web site.

Word 6.0 was the second attempt to develop a common code base version of Word. The first, code-named Pyramid, had been an attempt to completely rewrite the existing product. It was abandoned when Chris Peters replaced Jeff Raikes as the general manager of the Word group and determined it would take the development team too long to rewrite and then catch up with all the new capabilities that could have been added in the same time without a rewrite. Therefore, Word 6.0 for Windows and Macintosh were both derived from Word 2.0 for Windows code base. The Word 3.0 to 5.0 for Windows version numbers were skipped (outside of DBCS locales) in order to keep the version numbers consistent between Macintosh and Windows versions. Supporters of Pyramid claimed that it would have been faster, smaller, and more stable than the product that was eventually released for Macintosh, and which was compiled using a beta version of Visual C++ 2.0 that targets the Macintosh, so many optimizations have to be turned off (the version 4.2.1 of Office is compiled using the final version), and sometimes use the Windows API simulation library included. Pyramid would have been truly cross-platform, with machine-independent application code and a small mediation layer between the application and the operating system.

More recent versions of Word for Macintosh are no longer ported versions of Word for Windows.

Later versions of Word have more capabilities than merely word processing. The drawing tool allows simple desktop publishing operations, such as adding graphics to documents.

== Write for Atari ST ==
In 1986, Atari announced an agreement with Microsoft to bring Microsoft Write to the Atari ST. The agreement was first teased by Compute!'s Atari ST Disk & Magazine in October 1986 (the premier issue) via the rumors & gossip section reporting, "Mum's The Word: At this writing, Atari is expected to soon announce a major software deal with a big-name software company--one of the biggest, in fact. If the deal goes through, it should turn a lot of heads and gain new respect for Atari and the ST. Even the Macintosh and IBM people will be impressed. Sorry, but we promised not to reveal any more about this one."

Atari ST User’s Mike Cowley commented on the enthusiasm within the industry regarding the agreement between Atari and Microsoft writing, “It is not just the provision of the package that is being seen as a coup by Atari, but the fact that it carries with it an endorsement for the ST from such a powerful company. “You could compare it with a blessing from the Pope”, observed one industry pundit.” ST-Log’s D.F. Scott offered a thoughtful insight on the impact of the agreement, “Superior or mediocre (Microsoft Word), Atari has scored a victory in acquiring Microsoft's assistance. There's only one microcomputer I can name, to date, which has thrived without being somehow shaped by the hand of Bill Gates at Microsoft, and it is the ST. That should be an indication of the machine's strength-it has independence, not "compatibility."

For the 1988 holiday shopping season, STart magazine reported Atari bundling Microsoft Write with a couple of their Atari ST packages including an Atari Mega ST 2 package (Atari SLM804 laser printer, Microsoft Write, The Terminal Emulator, and VIP Professional) for $2995 and an Atari 520STFM monochrome package (Arrakis Scholastic Series package, Atari Planetarium, Battlezone, Microsoft Write, and Missile Command) for $699.

Microsoft Write for the Atari ST retailed at $129.95 and is one of two high-profile PC word processors that were released on the Atari platform. The other application is WordPerfect. Getting Microsoft Word and WordPerfect on the Atari ST platform was considered a big win for Atari as during the ST era Atari (reemerging from the video game crash of 1983 as a Fortune 500 public company) was trying to downplay their videogames image and reimagine itself as a serious business computer brand as it competed against the PC and Macintosh markets. Leonard Tramiel (Vice President Of Software Development) boasted of Microsoft and WordPerfect Corporation's involvement on the Atari ST platform saying, "You don't get much bigger names than those." STart would declare, “The two most talked-about programs under development are Microsoft Write and WordPerfect.”

Microsoft Write also featured a "Help Screen" tool to help a user explore the advanced features of the word processor. STart praised the help screen feature stating that “Write's online help screens are a significant aid: their form and presentation should be seriously studied by other ST developers. Each help screen doesn't just list the commands, it actually explains how to use the program in easily understood language.”

STart's Ian Chadwick wrote, "To put Write into perspective, it is basically a decent GEM-based word processor, but at a price that puts it above most of its competitors." Writing in Antic, Gregg Pearlman commented, "You could call Write a "full-featured" word processor. It's GEM-based and it can (but doesn't have to) run under GDOS. It can use any of several fonts in a WYSIWYG format. It has a search-and-replace feature as well as cut-and-paste, and a visible (non-editable) copy buffer called the Clipboard." Atari ST User described Microsoft Write in their ST User Software Buyer’s Guide as, “Easy-to-use GDOS document processor. Very reminiscent of the Macintosh in places.” Atari Explorer's John Jainschigg wrote, "All in all, Microsoft Write is a powerful, flexible, and genuinely easy-to-use word processor appropriate for business, professional, and academic writing."

In 1990 Atari ST User would reminisce about the 1986 agreement milestone that brought Word to the Atari ST writing, "Four Years Ago: Atari announces that US software giant Microsoft, is to produce an ST version of their Macintosh document processor, Microsoft Word. The ST package, to be called Microsoft Write, was said at the time to signify the ST's arrival as a serious business tool."

== Microsoft Office ==
=== Word 95 ===
Word 95 was released as part of Office 95 and was numbered 7.0, consistently with all Office components. It ran exclusively on the Win32 platform, but otherwise had few new features. The file format did not change.

=== Word 97 ===
Word 97 had the same general operating performance as later versions such as Word 2000. This was the first copy of Word featuring the Office Assistant, "Clippit", which was an animated helper used in all Office programs. This was a takeover from the earlier launched concept in Microsoft Bob. Word 97 introduced the macro programming language Visual Basic for Applications (VBA) which remains in use in Word 2016.

=== Word 98 ===
Word 98 for the Macintosh gained many features of Word 97, and was bundled with the Macintosh Office 98 package. Document compatibility reached parity with Office 97 and Word on the Mac became a viable business alternative to its Windows counterpart. Unfortunately, Word on the Mac in this and later releases also became vulnerable to future macro viruses that could compromise Word (and Excel) documents, leading to the only situation where viruses could be cross-platform. A Windows version of this was only bundled with the Japanese/Korean Microsoft Office 97 Powered By Word 98 and could not be purchased separately. It was then released in the same period as well.

=== Word 2001/Word X ===
Word 2001 was bundled with the Macintosh Office for that platform, acquiring most, if not all, of the feature set of Word 2000. Released in October 2000, Word 2001 was also sold as an individual product. The Macintosh version, Word X, released in 2001, was the first version to run natively on (and required) Mac OS X.

=== Word 2002/XP ===
Word 2002 was bundled with Office XP and was released in 2001. It had many of the same features as Word 2000, but had a major new feature called the 'Task Panes', which gave quicker information and control to a lot of features that were before only available in modal dialog boxes. One of the key advertising strategies for the software was the removal of the Office Assistant in favor of a new help system, although it was simply disabled by default.

=== Word 2003 ===
Microsoft Office 2003 is an office suite developed and distributed by Microsoft for its Windows operating system. Office 2003 was released to manufacturing on August 19, 2003, and was later released to retail on October 21, 2003. It was the successor to Office XP and the predecessor to Office 2007.

=== Word 2004 ===
A new Macintosh version of Office was released in May 2004. Substantial cleanup of the various applications (Word, Excel, PowerPoint) and feature parity with Office 2003 (for Microsoft Windows) created a very usable release. Microsoft released patches through the years to eliminate most known macro vulnerabilities from this version. While Apple released Pages and the open source community created NeoOffice, Word remains the most widely used word processor on the Macintosh. Office 2004 for Mac is a version of Microsoft Office developed for Mac OS X. It is equivalent to Office 2003 for Windows. The software was originally written for PowerPC Macs, so Macs with Intel CPUs must run the program under Mac OS X's Rosetta emulation layer. Also: Stable release: v11.6.6 / December 13, 2011; 7 years ago

=== Word 2007 ===
The release includes numerous changes, including a new XML-based file format, a redesigned interface, an integrated equation editor and bibliographic management. Additionally, an XML data bag was introduced, accessible via the object model and file format, called Custom XML – this can be used in conjunction with a new feature called Content Controls to implement structured documents. It also has contextual tabs, which are functionality specific only to the object with focus, and many other features like Live Preview (which enables you to view the document without making any permanent changes), Mini Toolbar, Super-tooltips, Quick Access toolbar, SmartArt, etc.

Word 2007 uses a new file format called docx. Word 2000–2003 users on Windows systems can install a free add-on called the "Microsoft Office Compatibility Pack" to be able to open, edit, and save the new Word 2007 files. Alternatively, Word 2007 can save to the old doc format of Word 97–2003.

=== Word 2008 ===
Word 2008 was released on January 15, 2008. It includes some new features from Word 2007, such as a ribbon-like feature that can be used to select page layouts and insert custom diagrams and images. Word 2008 also features native support for the new Office Open XML format, although the old doc format can be set as a default. Microsoft Office 2008 for Mac is a version of the Microsoft Office productivity suite for Mac OS X. It supersedes Office 2004 for Mac and is the Mac OS X equivalent of Office 2007. Office 2008 was developed by Microsoft's Macintosh Business Unit and released on January 15, 2008.

=== Word 2010 ===
Microsoft Office 2010 is a version of the Microsoft Office productivity suite for Microsoft Windows. Office 2010 was released to manufacturing on April 15, 2010, and was later made available for retail and online purchase on June 15, 2010. It is the successor to Office 2007 and the predecessor to Office 2013.

=== Word 2013 ===
The release of Word 2013 has brought Word a cleaner look and this version focuses further on Cloud Computing with documents being saved automatically to OneDrive (previously Skydrive). If enabled, documents and settings roam with the user. Other notable features are a new read mode which allows for horizontal scrolling of pages in columns, a bookmark to find where the user left off reading their document and opening PDF documents in Word just like Word content. The version released for the Windows 8 operating system is modified for use with a touchscreen and on tablets. It is the first version of Word to not run on Windows XP or Windows Vista.

=== Word 2016 ===
On July 9, 2015, Microsoft Word 2016 was released. Features include the tell me, share and faster shape formatting options. Other useful features include realtime collaboration, which allows users to store documents on Share Point or OneDrive, as well as an improved version history and a smart lookup tool. As usual, several editions of the program were released, including one for home and one for business.

=== Word 2019 ===
Word 2019 added support for Scalable Vector Graphics, Microsoft Translator, and LaTeX, as well as expanded drawing functionality.

=== Word 2021 ===
Word 2021 was released in October 2021. As of late 2025, the latest version was 2509 (build 19231.20194).

=== Word 2024 ===
Word 2024 was released in October 2024. As of late 2025, the latest version was 2509 (build 19231.20194).

=== Word included with Office 365 ===
Microsoft Office 365 is a free/paid subscription plan for the classic Office applications.
