= Microsoft Multimedia Viewer =

Multimedia authoring tool by Microsoft

- Developer(s): Microsoft
- Target platform(s): Microsoft Windows, Tandy Video Information System, Sony Multimedia CD-ROM Player
- Editor software: Microsoft Multimedia Viewer Publishing Toolkit
- Player software: Microsoft Multimedia Viewer
- Format(s): MVB
- Application(s): Reference work, encyclopedia
- Status: Discontinued
- License: Proprietary

Microsoft Multimedia Viewer or simply Viewer was a multimedia authoring tool for Windows built upon WinHelp online help format. The toolkit was used to develop Microsoft's early Windows CD-ROM reference titles like Encarta, Cinemania and Bookshelf, as well as for a number of third-party multimedia titles for Windows 3.1 like the CD-ROM edition of The Merck Manual.

Just like WinHelp files, Viewer files were compiled from Rich Text Format (RTF) source documents. Users of both WinHelp and Multimedia Viewer authoring tools noted similarities between them. Some tools for .hlp file decompiling, like WinHelp Decompiler (open source) or Herd Software's Help to RTF, can extract them from Viewer's .mvb files.

The development of Viewer, initially named "WinDoc" and "WinBook," began in 1989. The initial version was released in September 1991 as a part of the Multimedia Development Kit, with a version 2.0 announced in 1993. Software bundles which included the publishing toolkit were priced at $495 with a royalty-free runtime version. A custom version of Viewer 2.0, limited to 25 topics, was included with a $39.95 tutorial book published in 1994 by the Waite Group.

In addition to titles for Windows-based PCs, Multimedia Viewer could compile titles for Tandy Video Information System and other Modular Windows systems, as well as Sony Multimedia CD-ROM Player, a portable MS-DOS-based CD-ROM XA reader released in 1992. Viewer did not support a concurrent CD-i data format, with Rob Glaser, Microsoft's vice president of Multimedia & Consumer Systems at the time, being dismissive of it as "not based on any standard."

== Reception ==
In a 1992 comparison of five multimedia authoring tools, including Authorware and Macromind Director, Jim Canning of InfoWorld awarded Viewer 1.0 the lowest score across the board. The journalist praised Viewer's full-text search ability and noted it's the only one reviewed which could be used to build hypertext. However, he criticized its lack of animation support and a "tedious and error-prone" word processor-based workflow.

While Viewer 1.0 was intended to be the main tool to build the original edition of Encarta, the encyclopedia's developers deemed it inadequate for the task. 34% of total Encarta code was added to build features which Viewer could not provide on its own, according to its developers’ accounts. A preliminary version of Viewer 2.0 was made available to the Encarta team before the new version of the authoring tool was fully completed.

== Notes ==
=== Works cited ===
- Pruitt, Stephen (1994). Microsoft Multimedia Viewer How-To CD: Create Exciting Multimedia with Video, Animation, Music, and Speech for Windows. Corte Madera, CA: Waite Group Press. ISBN 9781878739605.
- Moody, Fred (1995). I Sing the Body Electronic: A Year with Microsoft on the Multimedia Frontier. Viking. ISBN 9780670848751. OL 1270724M.
