= Controlled digital lending =

Digital library lending model

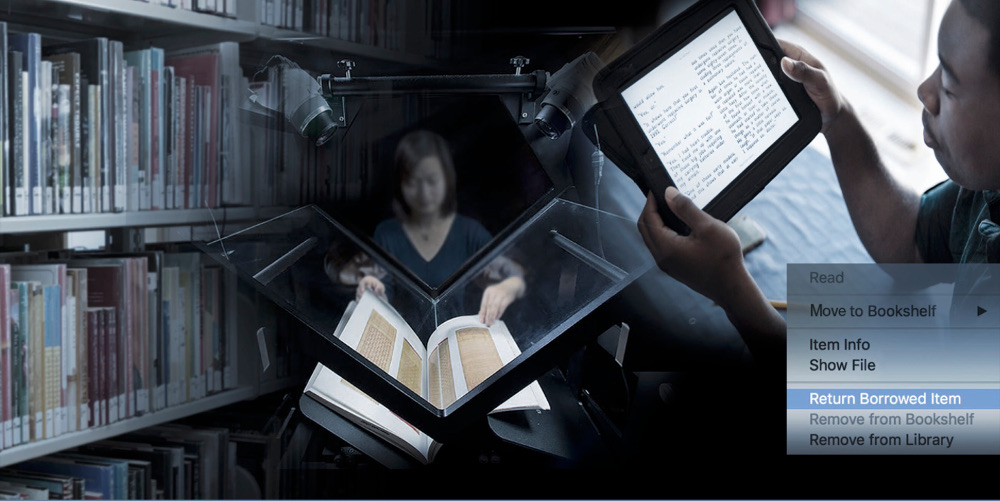
Representation of Controlled Digital Lending process

Controlled digital lending (CDL) is a model by which libraries digitize materials in their collection and make them available for lending on an owned-to-loaned ratio. That is, libraries can only digitize and lend the number of physical copies they have legally acquired through purchase or donation.

In the United States, the model is based on interpretations of the United States copyright principles of fair use and copyright exhaustion. Digitization and lending efforts, such as Internet Archive's National Emergency Library in 2020, have generated criticism about CDL as well as litigation that involved its fair use. In the literature, the concept of independent Secure Digital Lending (iSDL) has emerged as a European counterpart to the American Controlled Digital Lending (CDL).

== History ==
=== Precursors to CDL ===
Prior to Controlled Digital Lending (CDL), some notable archival and digitization efforts included Project Gutenberg in the 1970s, the university-led collaborative effort "Making of America", which involved scanning and providing digital access to books in the public domain. Google Books emerged in the early 2000s as an effort to scan books and magazines into a digital database, leading to significant copyright litigation. These projects involved sharing digitally accessible scans of print materials on the internet, with varying degrees of access and public response.

In the United States, a direct precursor to CDL was the "Digitize and Lend" program begun in 2011 by the Open Library, a program of the Internet Archive. Also in 2011, the basic principles of CDL were articulated by Michelle M. Wu in her paper Building a Collaborative Digital Collection: A Necessary Evolution in Libraries. The use of the term "Controlled Digital Lending" to refer to this concept first appeared in the Position Statement on Controlled Digital Lending, published in 2018 alongside a white paper explaining their legal arguments.

The IFLA Position on Controlled Digital Lending states that libraries have practiced forms of controlled lending for many years, although the term Controlled Digital Lending only recently came into use.

=== COVID-19 and the National Emergency Library ===
During the COVID-19 pandemic, Internet Archive responded to institutional closures, such as schools and libraries, by suspending waitlists on its lending collection and removing a defining control of CDL, which precipitated a major copyright lawsuit from a publisher (see below). Prior to the national emergency, Internet Archive used the CDL legal justifications on fair use and technical controls as a means for digitally lending one copy of a digitized Open Library book at a time. The pandemic-driven National Emergency Library initiative, and its temporary suspension of the owned-to-loaned ratio, drew more critical attention to CDL as a concept and its proponents' fair use argument.

== How controlled digital lending works ==
=== CDL definition and requirements ===
Proponents argue that CDL is legal under fair use principles because it is defined by a one-copy/one-user model for lawfully acquired library-owned texts, with time constraints that mirror physical loan periods. CDL is distinguished from e-book lending, which follows a licensing model, meaning libraries pay to license the e-books and the lending terms are contractually negotiated with publishers or rights owners who ultimately decide on restrictions and time-constraints. CDL requires that libraries lend a scanned copy of their physically purchased book on an "owned to loaned" ratio, in order to mirror the physical lending process and borrowing time constraints.

=== Digital Rights Management (DRM) ===
Digital rights management (DRM) is the technical control used to ensure that any library-owned digitized work that is in copyright is loaned for a limited period of time, and that a one-to-one ratio of owned copies to borrowers is maintained. With CDL, a library takes a physical copy of a legally acquired item and digitizes it. After digitization, DRM is applied to the digital version, and the physical item is then made unavailable for loan. The library catalog record is usually the mechanism to give access to the digital loan, so the record is changed to point to the repository where the digital copy resides. In this way, there is only one copy being loaned for each copy owned by the library. After the loan expires, the DRM software removes the previous borrower's access and the book is available for loan to another patron.

Proponents of CDL argue that it is a modern digital extension of libraries' lending activity. Opponents criticize this interpretation, arguing that CDL involves copying, not mere lending, and that a library's purchase of a physical book does not entitle it to produce and lend an e-book or distribute digital copies.

== Legal basis ==
David R. Hansen and Kyle K. Courtney, authors of the 2018 white paper on CDL, based their legal framework on the first-sale doctrine (17 U.S.C. § 109(a)), a component of copyright law that determines owners' of a copyrighted work right to sell, lend, or share copies without permission or incurring fees. The first- sale doctrine is one reason libraries are able to lend books, because they have purchased the copyrighted work they are lending out and are legally allowed to share it without paying royalties each time it is borrowed. CDL advocates also maintain that the fourth factor of fair use is not violated because the market value of a book will not be impacted. Since under CDL a library is purchasing the book and following the one-copy/one-user model, proponents claim there is no loss of sale or enough incurred market harm to constitute a copyright injury as established in fair use jurisprudence.

== Adoption ==
CDL is increasingly being considered by a number of libraries and is being followed by library organizations across the United States as well as in other countries. Brazilian experts have argued that CDL can be applied in the country through a systematic interpretation of cultural rights that extrinsically limits copyright. The Internet Archive has gathered together 12 stories from their blog about libraries that are engaged in aspects of CDL. Lisa Petrides of the Institute for the Study of Knowledge Management in Education, argues that in terms of school libraries, CDL is a positive step forward, but does not go far enough.

In May 2021, the International Federation of Library Associations and Institutions (IFLA) stated that "there is a strong socio-economic case" for CDL; that CDL respects "a number of desirable and widely-recognised principles [...] (libraries' ability to freely acquire and lend, the technological neutrality of law, the possibility to combine exceptions)"; that CDL's legal basis supports the wider public interest.

In January 2022, the National Information Standards Organization (NISO) formed a working group that developed a "recommended practice draft for interoperable systems for controlled digital lending", but did not officially release it following a negative response from publishers. NISO has continued to put out resources, such as conference proceedings and resources, in lieu of a potential future publication exploring CDL mechanisms in libraries and consortia.

== Criticism and legal controversy ==
Opponents of CDL primarily include authors, publishers, and writers guilds who challenge CDL's validity under fair use in copyright law, primarily focusing on economic impact. Opponents argue that digitize-and-lend models do broadly impact book sales and e-book license acquisitions, and threaten royalties that make up a major portion of an author's revenue.

=== National Writers Union ===
The National Writers Union, an opponent of CDL, argues that CDL is not like lending, which does not require copying, and dispute the claim that only one copy at a time is available for reading. They say that CDL involves first making an unauthorized digital copy of a printed edition of a work, and then making an additional unauthorized digital copy for each "borrower". They also argue that unencrypted digital copies are distributed for viewing in a Web browser, and that these copies can be retained, viewed, or printed from the browser cache even after the e-book is marked as "returned" and is available for "lending" to other readers.

Authors' and publishers' groups have questioned the copyright interpretations that underlie CDL. In early 2019, the National Writers Union and a coalition of forty national and international organizations and federations of writers, photographers, visual artists, translators, publishers, and reproduction rights organizations released a statement entitled "Appeal from the victims of Controlled Digital Lending (CDL)" that claimed that CDL "violates the economic and moral rights of authors".

=== American Association of Publishers ===
In a news article in Publishers Weekly The Association of American Publishers is quoted as stating that CDL "'denigrates' the incentive copyright provides for authors and publishers". The Authors Guild relies on the case of Capitol Records, LLC v. ReDigi Inc., which established that ReDigi could not resell digital music, to argue that libraries would similarly be prohibited from loaning digitized version of books that were legally purchased, and argues that CDL results in lost sales.

Various scholars have framed the Capitol Records, LLC v. ReDigi Inc. as leaving room for CDL as part of a library's non-profit, educational mission. For example, the opinion, authored by Judge Pierre N. Leval, found ReDigi had no actual control of the digital music being sold (licensed iTunes mp3's) and that ReDigi "made reproductions of Plaintiffs' works for the purpose of resale in competition with the Plaintiffs' market for the sale of their sound recordings". Various scholars have pointed out that libraries are not selling works in direct competition with publishers, like the Defendant in ReDigi.

Libraries are purchasing books from the marketplace in order to loan the books to their patrons. Additionally Judge Pierre N. Leval, also the originator of the doctrine of transformative fair use, explained in the opinion that a use can be transformative when it "utilizes technology to achieve the transformative purpose of improving delivery of content without unreasonably encroaching on the commercial entitlements of the rights holder". Again, analyzing this language from the case, some scholars have asserted that CDL does not unreasonably encroach the market for these books any differently than the legal uses already permitted by the copyright law when libraries loan books physically.

=== Hachette Book Group, Inc. v. Internet Archive ===
In Hachette Book Group, Inc. v. Internet Archive, 664 F.Supp.3d 370 (S.D.N.Y., Mar. 24, 2023), the United States District Court for the Southern District of New York determined that the Internet Archive committed copyright infringement by scanning and distributing copies of books online. Stemming from the creation of the National Emergency Library (NEL) during the onset of the COVID-19 pandemic, publishing company Hachette Book Group alleged that the Open Library and the National Emergency Library facilitated copyright infringement. The case involves the fair use of controlled digital lending (CDL) systems.

On March 25, 2023, the court ruled against Internet Archive. On August 11, 2023 the parties reached a negotiated judgement. The agreement prescribes a permanent injunction against the Internet Archive preventing it from distributing the plaintiffs books as well as an undisclosed payment to plaintiffs. The agreement also preserves the right for the Internet Archive to appeal the previous ruling.

The trial court's ruling in this case was affirmed on appeal to the United States Court of Appeals for the Second Circuit on September 4, 2024 in Hachette Book Group, Inc. v. Internet Archive, 115 F.4th 163 (2d Cir. September 4, 2024). The court stated "On the one hand, eBook licensing fees may impose a burden on libraries and reduce access to creative work. On the other hand, authors have a right to be compensated in connection with the copying and distribution of their original creations. Congress balanced these 'competing claims upon the public interest' in the Copyright Act. We must uphold that balance here." As a matter of binding precedent, the Second Circuit's ruling governs within the states of Connecticut, New York, and Vermont, but is merely persuasive authority in other states.

On December 4, 2024, the Internet Archive announced that it had decided to refrain from petitioning the Supreme Court to overturn the Second Circuit's decision. Although the Second Circuit decision is not binding outside its territory, the Internet Archive itself remains bound by the permanent injunction, and affirmed that it would "honor the ... agreement to remove books from lending at [the] publishers' requests".

== Independent Secure Digital Lending (iSDL) – a European counterpart to CDL ==
Independent Secure Digital Lending (iSDL) is a model of digital library lending developed in the European context, allowing libraries to lend digitized copies of works from their collections under controlled conditions. It is often described as a European counterpart to Controlled Digital Lending (CDL).

=== Explanation of (independent) Secure Digital Lending ===
- Loans are made by strictly defined entities, i.e. establishments which are accessible to the public (e.g. libraries) and which derive no direct or indirect economic or commercial advantage from their lending activity;
- Lending covers the lending of a digital copy of a book;
- Loans are made under the one copy-one user model;
- Lending is carried out in a mimetic (i.e. allowing patrons to download electronic copies of books) or a quasi-mimetic fashion (i.e. allowing the use of electronic copies of books in streaming);
- Lending is only for a limited period;
- After the lending period has expired, the user cannot use the e-Book;
- A digital copy of a book must be obtained from a lawful source, but the library can make an electronic copy of a legally obtained copy of a paper book;
- e-Lending under the (i)SDL model gives rise to the right to remuneration (PLR) in line with the Rental and Lending Directive;
- There is no transfer of data, including personal data of library patrons, to publishers or other third parties.

Unlike CDL in the United States, which is often justified under the doctrine of fair use, iSDL is grounded in European Union law, particularly:

- Article 6 of Directive 2006/115/EC (Rental and Lending Directive)
- Article 5(2)(c) of Directive 2001/29/EC (InfoSoc Directive)

Scholarly and policy discussions emphasize that, although iSDL and CDL share similar technical implementations, their legal justifications differ significantly. In particular, the iSDL model, in light of the requirements of the Rental and Lending Directive, is linked to the requirement that such lending mechanisms be accompanied by remuneration schemes, notably those associated with Public Lending Right (PLR). As a result, legal arguments raised against CDL in U.S. case law may not be directly applicable in the European context.

The legal feasibility of iSDL is often discussed in light of the case law of the Court of Justice of the European Union, in particular:

- the judgment in Vereniging Openbare Bibliotheken v Stichting Leenrecht (2016), in which the Court held that the concept of "lending" under EU law may include the lending of digital copies of books under a "one copy, one user" model, provided that the copy was obtained from a lawful source and access is limited in time;
- the judgment in Technische Universität Darmstadt v Eugen Ulmer KG (2014), in which the Court confirmed that libraries may digitize works in their collections without rightholder consent when necessary to make them available to users on dedicated terminals, subject to certain limitations. In his Opinion, Advocate General Maciej Szpunar indicated that such digitisation may, by analogy, also be relevant for enabling electronic lending by libraries, provided that the use remains consistent with the objectives and limitations of EU copyright law.

These rulings are frequently cited as supporting the view that controlled digital lending models such as iSDL may be compatible with EU law under specific conditions, particularly where access is restricted, the number of simultaneous users is limited, and the use serves a public-interest mission of libraries. At the same time, the extent to which iSDL is fully covered by existing EU law remains subject to ongoing legal and academic debate.

== Other countries ==
In the United Kingdom, which does not have the concept of fair use that American copyright law has, there have been legal threats from the Society of Authors against the Internet Archive for lending works under British copyright in a country where controlled digital lending is not legal.

== See also ==
- HathiTrust
- E-book lending
- Democratization of knowledge
