= Oppenheim + Zebrak =

US law firm

Oppenheim + Zebrak LLP
- Headquarters: 4530 Wisconsin Avenue, NW, 5th Floor; Washington, D.C.
- Key people: Matthew Oppenheim; Scott A. Zebrak
- Date founded: 2011
- Company type: Limited liability partnership
- Website: oandzlaw.com

Oppenheim + Zebrak is a United States law firm specializing in copyright infringement and anti-piracy. The firm was founded in 2011 by Matt Oppenheim and Scott Zebrak and is based in Tenleytown, Washington, D.C.

== Notable cases ==
In Cengage v. Book Dog Books, Oppenheim + Zebrak represented publishers Cengage, McGraw-Hill Education, Pearson Education, and Wiley (as the "Educational Publishers Enforcement Group") against a reseller of textbooks. In an April 2018 verdict, a jury awarded the book publishers $34.2 million in damages for trademark and copyright infringement.

In Sony v. Cox, Oppenheim + Zebrak represented music corporations Sony Music, Warner Records and Universal Music in a lawsuit against Internet service provider Cox Communications for "enabling its subscribers to copy more than 10,000 works over peer-to-peer networks like BitTorrent." In a $1 billion verdict, the jury awarded the multinational companies nearly $100,000 for each infringed work. In an opinion written by judge Liam O'Grady, the court denied Cox's motion for a new trial, finding the award "wasn't grossly excessive."

In a June 2020 lawsuit against the non-profit Internet Archive, Oppenheim + Zebrak represented Hachette, Penguin Random House, John Wiley & Sons, and HarperCollins, all members of the Association of American Publishers. The suit, filed in the Southern New York Federal District Court, alleges that the Open Library violated copyright when it established a National Emergency Library service during the COVID-19 pandemic when most libraries were closed to the public.

== See also ==
- Bancroft PLLC
