= E-book lending =

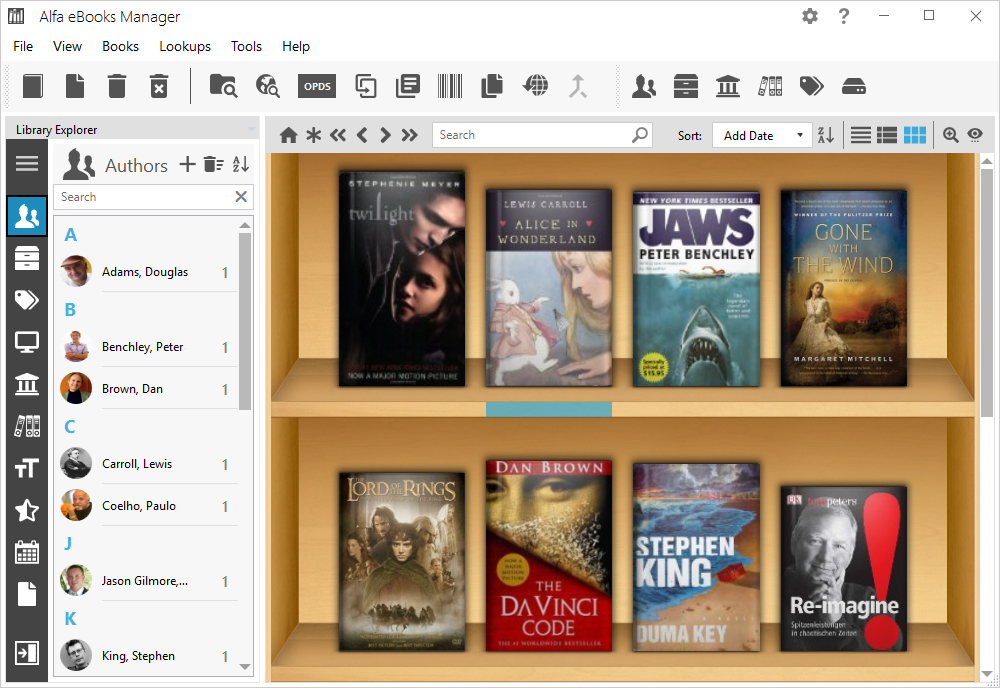
An example of an ebook lending manager.

E-book lending or elending is a practice in which access to already-purchased downloads or online reads of e-books is made available on a time-limited basis to others. It works around the digital rights management built into online-store-published e-books by limiting access to a purchased e-book file to the borrower, resulting in loss of access to the file by the purchaser for the duration of the borrowing period.

As of 2014, over 90% of U.S. public libraries offer ebook lending. Many of those libraries use OverDrive, which provides ebook access to about 43,000 libraries and schools in 76 countries. Overdrive is the only eLending service that works with the Amazon Kindle, but that functionality is limited to U.S. library readers only.

E-book lending is different from physical book lending. Libraries have always been able to acquire and lend physical books without requiring any special permission from publishers. However, acquiring and lending ebooks involves the making of copies and transmissions, which means copyright laws need to be complied with. As a result, publishers get to decide the terms on which libraries can access books for elending. Since 2011, HarperCollins has allowed libraries to lend out its ebooks just 26 times before the licence expires and the book is deleted from its collection. In 2018, Penguin Random House announced that all of its books would be available only on two year licences, after which they would also be deleted from collections. Hachette Book Group makes some of its books available for library eLending in the United States and Canada, but refuses to do so within Commonwealth countries such as the UK, Australia and New Zealand. Amazon Publishing is the world's fifth-largest supplier of ebooks, but as of late 2019, also refuses to license them to public libraries (in any country).

E-book lending has become an increasing practice in the early 2010s for public libraries as well as independent e-book lending communities; the latter is increasingly viable, especially for books which are not available in the Amazon Kindle's Format, Mobipocket or Barnes & Noble Nook formats. Websites such as Lendle.me and bookLending.com have emerged to facilitate lending and borrowing of books between strangers. In a survey of interlibrary loan librarians it was found that 92% of libraries held ebooks in their collections and that 27% of those libraries had negotiated interlibrary loan rights for some of their ebooks. This survey found significant barriers to conducting interlibrary loan for ebooks. Demand-driven acquisition (DDA) has been around for a few years in public libraries, which allows vendors to streamline the acquisition process by offering to match a library's selection profile to the vendor's e-book titles. The library's catalog is then populated with records for all the e-books that match the profile. The decision to purchase the title is left to the patrons, although the library can set purchasing conditions such as a maximum price and purchasing caps so that the dedicated funds are spent according to the library's budget. The 2012 meeting of the Association of American University Presses included a panel on DDA of books produced by university presses based on a preliminary report by Joseph Esposito, a digital publishing consultant who has studied the implications of PDA with a grant from the Andrew W. Mellon Foundation.

Some publishers have feared that making books available for loan may deter people from buying the books. However, ebook lending has the potential to increase the discoverability of books, encouraging readers to try out new authors and genres, resulting in increased purchases. The Panorama Project has also reported positive results when OverDrive highlights books as part of its 'Big Library Read' community reading campaigns. When first-time author Jennifer McGaha's 'Flat Broke With Two Goats' was selected for the April 2018 'Big Library Read', it was featured by over 14,700 US public libraries and saw its sales grow by 818% for ebooks and 201% (for print).

In December 2010, Amazon introduced the ability for Kindle users to lend ebooks to friends for a 14-day period. However, not all books supported lending. This ceased without an official announcement by Amazon in August 2022.

== Alternative lending models ==
Until August 2020, Amazon operated a Kindle Owners' Lending Library that enabled paid Amazon Prime users to borrow from a collection of over 600,000 ebooks without any due date, with books being delivered to Kindle and Kindle Fire devices, but not to the free Kindle reading apps for other platforms. The same book could be borrowed by a number of users at the same time, and users could have kept a book for as long as they wanted. Alternatively, the books that are available in the public domain can be downloaded in different formats from many sites like archive.org.

== See also ==
- Controlled digital lending
