= Microsoft Bookshelf =

CD-ROM reference collection by Microsoft

- Microsoft Bookshelf 2000 home page
- Developer: Microsoft
- Release: September 8, 1987; 39 years ago
- Final release: 2000 / 1999; 27 years ago
- Operating system: MS-DOS, Microsoft Windows, Classic Mac OS
- Successor: Microsoft Encarta
- Type: Reference work, encyclopedia
- Website: Microsoft Encarta Bookshelf at the Wayback Machine (archived June 21, 2000)

Microsoft Bookshelf is a discontinued reference collection introduced in 1987 as part of Microsoft's promotion of CD-ROM technology as a distribution medium for electronic publishing. The original MS-DOS version showcased the storage capacity of CD-ROM technology, and was accessed while the user was using one of 13 different word processor programs that Bookshelf supported. Subsequent versions were produced for Windows and became part of the Microsoft Home brand. It was often bundled with personal computers as a cheaper alternative to the Encarta Suite. The Encarta Deluxe Suite / Reference Library versions also bundled Bookshelf.

== Content ==
The original 1987 edition contained:

- The Original Roget's Thesaurus of English Words and Phrases
- The American Heritage Dictionary of the English Language
- World Almanac and Book of Facts
- Bartlett's Familiar Quotations
- The Chicago Manual of Style (13th Edition)
- the U.S. ZIP Code Directory
- Houghton Mifflin Usage Alert, Spelling Verifier and Corrector, Business Information Sources, and Forms and Letters.

Titles in non-US versions of Bookshelf were different. For example, the 1997 UK edition (Bookshelf British Reference Collection) included the Chambers Dictionary, Bloomsbury Treasury of Quotations, and Hutchinson Concise Encyclopedia.

The Windows release of Bookshelf added a number of new reference titles, including The Concise Columbia Encyclopedia and an Internet Directory. Other titles were added and some were dropped in subsequent years. By 1994, the English-language version also contained the Columbia Dictionary of Quotations; The Concise Columbia Encyclopedia; the Hammond Intermediate World Atlas; and The People's Chronology. By 2000, the collection came to include the Encarta Desk Encyclopedia, the Encarta Desk Atlas, the Encarta Style Guide and a specialized Computer and Internet Dictionary by Microsoft Press.

Microsoft Bookshelf was discontinued in 2000. In later editions of the Encarta suite (Encarta 2000 and onwards), Bookshelf was replaced with a dedicated Encarta Dictionary, a superset of the printed edition.

== Technology ==
=== Bookshelf 1.0 engine ===
Bookshelf 1.0 used a proprietary hypertext engine that Microsoft acquired when it bought Cytation in 1986 and made it the CD-ROM division, with president Thomas Lopez becoming a Microsoft vice president. Also used for Microsoft Stat Pack and Microsoft Small Business Consultant, it was a terminate-and-stay-resident program that ran alongside a dominant program, unbeknownst to the dominant program. Like Apple's similar Hypercard reader, Bookshelf engine's files used a single compound document, containing large numbers of subdocuments ("cards" or "articles"). They both differ from current browsers which normally treat each "page" or "article" as a separate file.

=== Bookshelf 2.0 engine ===
Collaborating with DuPont, the Microsoft CD-ROM division developed a Windows version of its engine for applications as diverse as document management, online help, and a CD-ROM encyclopedia. In a skunkworks project, these developers worked secretly with Multimedia Division developers so that the engine would be usable for more ambitious multimedia applications. Thus they integrated a multimedia markup language, full text search, and extensibility using software objects, all of which are commonplace in modern internet browsing.

In 1992, Microsoft started selling the Bookshelf engine to third-party developers, marketing the product as Microsoft Multimedia Viewer. The idea was that such a tool would help growth of CD-ROM titles that would spur demand for Windows. Although the engine had multimedia capabilities that would not be matched by Web browsers until the late 1990s, Microsoft Viewer did not enjoy commercial success as a standalone product. However, Microsoft continued to use the engine for its Encarta and WinHelp applications, though the multimedia functions are rarely used in Windows help files.

=== Viewer 3.0 ===
In 1993, the developers who were working on the next generation viewer were moved to the Cairo systems group which was charged with delivering Bill Gates' 'vision' of 'Information at your fingertips'. This advanced browser was a fully componentized application using what are now known as Component Object Model objects, designed for hypermedia browsing across large networks and whose main competitor was thought to be Lotus Notes. Nearly all technologies of Cairo shipped.

== Reception ==
BYTE in 1989 listed Microsoft Bookshelf as among the "Excellence" winners of the BYTE Awards, stating that it "is the first substantial application of CD-ROM technology" and "a harbinger of personal library systems to come". The software ranked 5th on PC Data's list of Top-Selling Reference Software for July 1997.

== Versions ==
- Versions for DOS/Windows/Mac:
  - Bookshelf 1987 Edition for MS-DOS
  - Bookshelf 1.0 (March 1991)
  - Bookshelf 1991 Edition (October 1991)
  - Bookshelf 1992 Edition
  - Bookshelf 1993 Edition (Not For Retail Sale, bundled with Tandy Sensation computers)
  - Bookshelf '94 (February 2, 1994)
  - Bookshelf '95 (first 32-bit version with some discs e.g. Microsoft Office 95 Professional, also 16-bit version for compatibility with Windows 3.x) This version uses Indeo 3.2 codec to play videos, 32-bit version still has 16-bit components for playing animations.
  - Bookshelf British Reference Collection (BRC)
  - Bookshelf 1996-'97 Edition (Last version for Windows 3.1) It still uses 16-bit components for certain areas of Bookshelf like animations.
  - Bookshelf 98 for Windows and Macintosh (Last version for Macintosh). The Windows version uses QuickTime 2.1.2 for Windows for 360° animations besides Indeo codec. It still uses 16-bit components for certain areas of Bookshelf like animations. For this edition exists also an Italian version called DizioROM.
  - Bookshelf 99 (this version switched to Shockwave Player ActiveX Control for media content and Encarta Image control for images). This is the first version integrated with the Encarta engine and uses purely 32-bit processes
  - Bookshelf 2000 (last English version for Windows)
  - Bookshelf 3.0 Japanese (last version for Windows). For this version, Microsoft switched from Shogakukan to Sanseidō dictionaries.

=== Contents by version ===
Package	Dictionary	Thesaurus	Almanac	Chronology or Timeline	Quotation Dictionary	Encyclopedia	Atlas	Web directory	Other reference materials	Other reference materials
Bookshelf 93	The American Heritage Dictionary of the English Language	Roget's Thesaurus	The World Almanac and Book of Facts 1992		The Columbia Dictionary of Quotations. Barlett's Familiar Quotations	The Concise Columbia Encyclopedia	Hammond Atlas			
Bookshelf 94	The American Heritage Dictionary of the English Language, Third Edition.	Roget's Thesaurus of English words and phrases	The World Almanac and Book of Facts 1994	The People's Chronology	The Columbia Dictionary of Quotations	The Concise Columbia Encyclopedia	Hammond Intermediate World Atlas			
Bookshelf 95	The American Heritage Dictionary, 3rd Ed.	Roget's Thesaurus	World Almanac and Book of Facts 1995	The People's Chronology	Columbia Dictionary of Quotations	The Concise Columbia Encyclopedia Third Edition	Hammond World Atlas		US ZIP Code Directory	
Bookshelf 1996-'97 Edition	The American Heritage Dictionary, 3rd Ed.	Roget's Thesaurus	World Almanac and Book of Facts 1996	The People's Chronology	Columbia Dictionary of Quotations	The Concise Columbia Encyclopedia Third Edition	Concise Encarta 96 World Atlas	Internet Directory 96	ZIP Code and Post Office Directory	
Bookshelf 1996-'97 Edition British Reference Collection	Chambers Dictionary	Longman's original Roget's Thesaurus			Bloomsbury Treasury of Quotations	Hutchinson Concise Encyclopedia, 1995 edition	Concise Encarta 96 World Atlas	Internet Directory 96		
Bookshelf 98	The American Heritage Dictionary, 3rd Ed.	Roget's Thesaurus	World Almanac and Book of Facts 1997	The People's Chronology	Columbia Dictionary of Quotations	Encarta 98 Desk Encyclopedia	Encarta 98 Desk World Atlas	Internet Directory 98	ZIP Code and Post Office Directory	Computer & Internet Dictionary
Bookshelf 99	The American Heritage Dictionary, 3rd Ed.	Roget's Thesaurus	Encarta 98 New World Almanac	Encarta New World Timeline	Columbia Dictionary of Quotations	Encarta 99 Desk Encyclopedia	Encarta 99 Desk World Atlas		Encarta Grammar & Style Guide	Computer & Internet Dictionary
Bookshelf 2000	The American Heritage Dictionary, 3rd Ed.	Roget's Thesaurus	Encarta 2000 New World Almanac	Encarta 2000 New World Timeline	Columbia Dictionary of Quotations	Encarta 2000 Desk Encyclopedia	Encarta 2000 Desk World Atlas		Encarta Manual of Style & Usage	Computer & Internet Dictionary
