= Data Discman =

Electronic book player

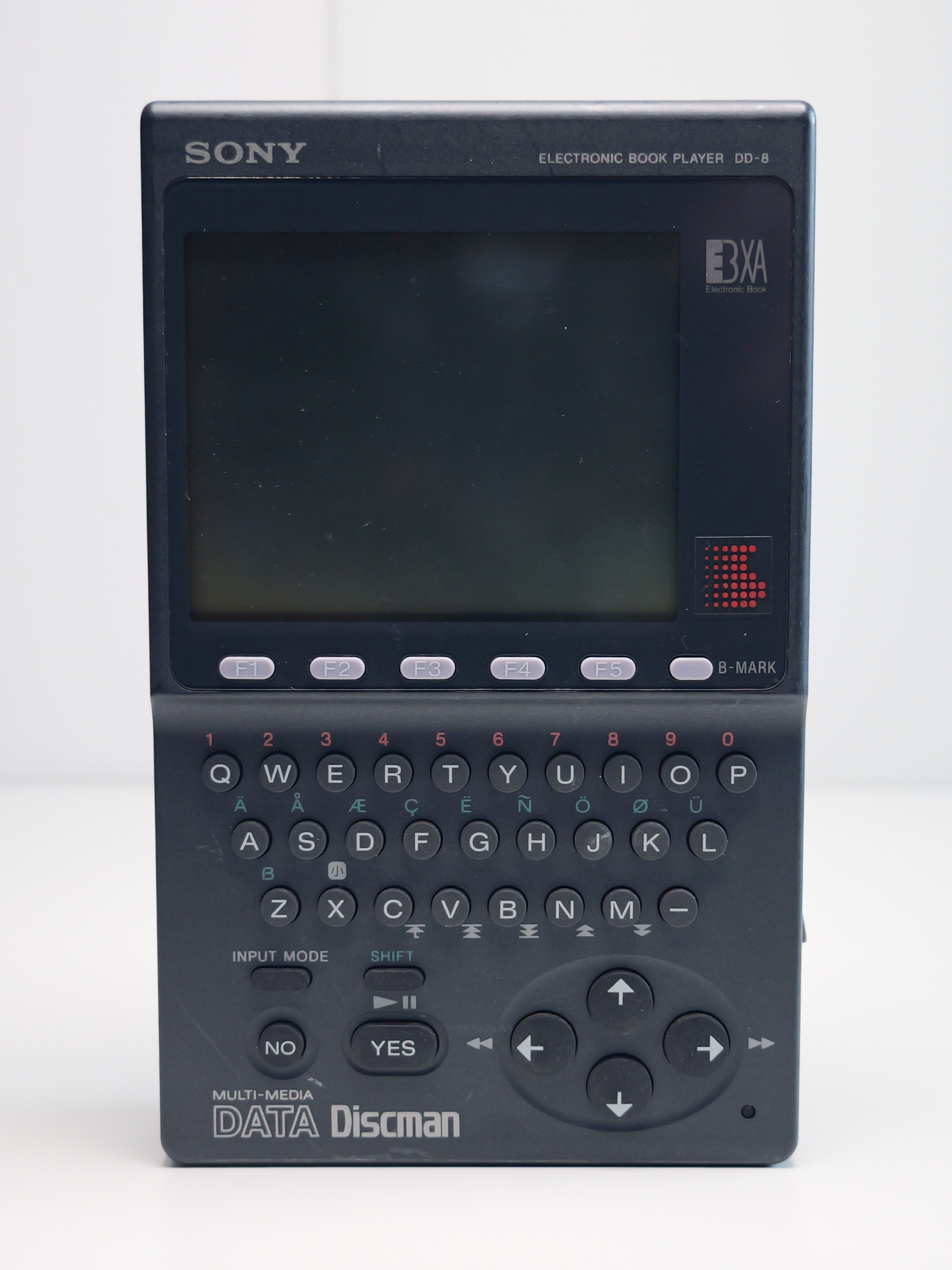
Sony Data Discman DD-8 electronic book player

The DD-8 Data Discman with packaging

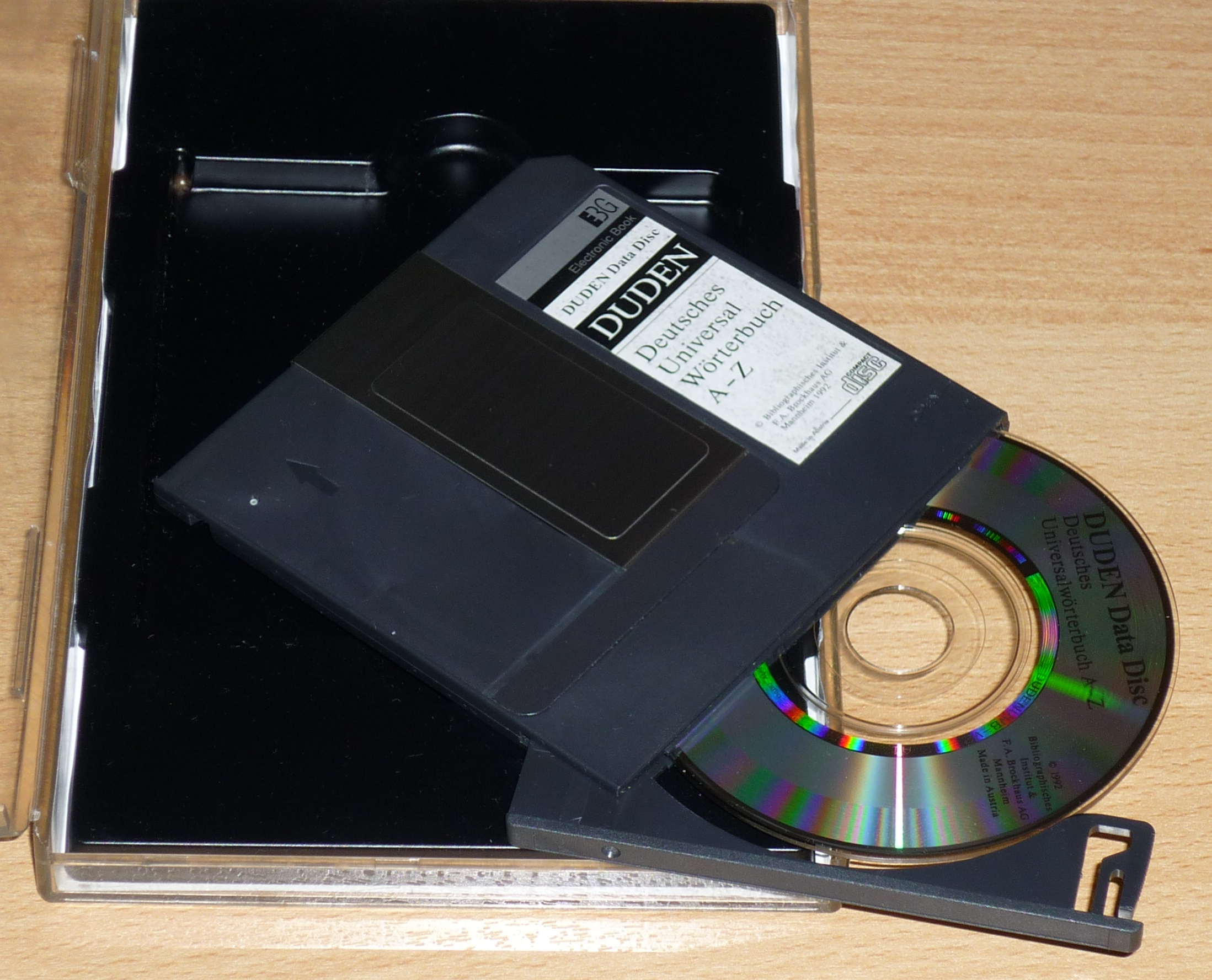
German Duden dictionary for the Data Discman, 1992

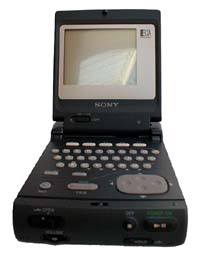
The DD-10EX on display at the Victoria and Albert Museum, London, 1995

The Data Discman (Japanese: データ ディスクマン, Hepburn: Dēta Disukuman) is an electronic book player developed and marketed by Sony Corporation, first introduced to Western markets in late 1991 or early 1992. The device targeted U.S. college students and international travelers but achieved limited commercial success outside Japan. In Japan, it was positioned as part of Sony’s broader "Discman" brand, originally used for portable CD players such as the D-50 released in 1984.

== Design and features ==
The Data Discman was designed for quick access to reference material stored on pre-recorded compact discs in the eponymous Electronic Book (EB) formats, based on the ISO 9660 file system; later upgrades to the standards have since been released, including EB-G, EB-XA, and S-EBXA. Over 240 titles have been commercially released. Search terms could be entered via a small QWERTY-style keyboard, with selection performed using dedicated "Yes" and "No" buttons.

Most models featured:

- A low-resolution grayscale LCD (256×200 pixels in early models; later versions up to 320×240 pixels, with some models in color)
- An integrated CD drive (Mini CD or full-size CD, depending on the model)
- A low-power onboard computer

Early versions could not play audio files but could play audio CDs, with content limited to pre-recorded encyclopedias, dictionaries, and novels, often created using the Sony Electronic Book Authoring System (SEBAS).

== Models ==
=== DD-1EX ===
The earliest western model, the DD-1EX, was released in 1991 and only played mini-CD audio (not MP3 data files) in addition to the EBG titles and is now part of the permanent collection of the Victoria and Albert Museum in London. The DD-1 was the earlier Japanese model in 1990. This model can use a bare Mini CD disc or one in a caddy. The disc is easily removed from the caddy. It takes 6 AA cells in a clip on pack, or optionally a rechargeable pack.

=== DD-10EX ===
Released in 1992 or 1993, the DD-10EX added the ability to play audio files. In the United Kingdom, it shipped with two discs:

- Thomson Electronic Directory (April 1992)
- Pocket Interpreter – a five-language travel conversation book

A DD-10EX was featured in the exhibition The Book and Beyond: Electronic Publishing and the Art of the Book at the Victoria and Albert Museum from April to October 1995. The event also showcased the Library of the Future CD-ROM, designed specifically for the Data Discman and published in 1993.

=== DD-85 ===
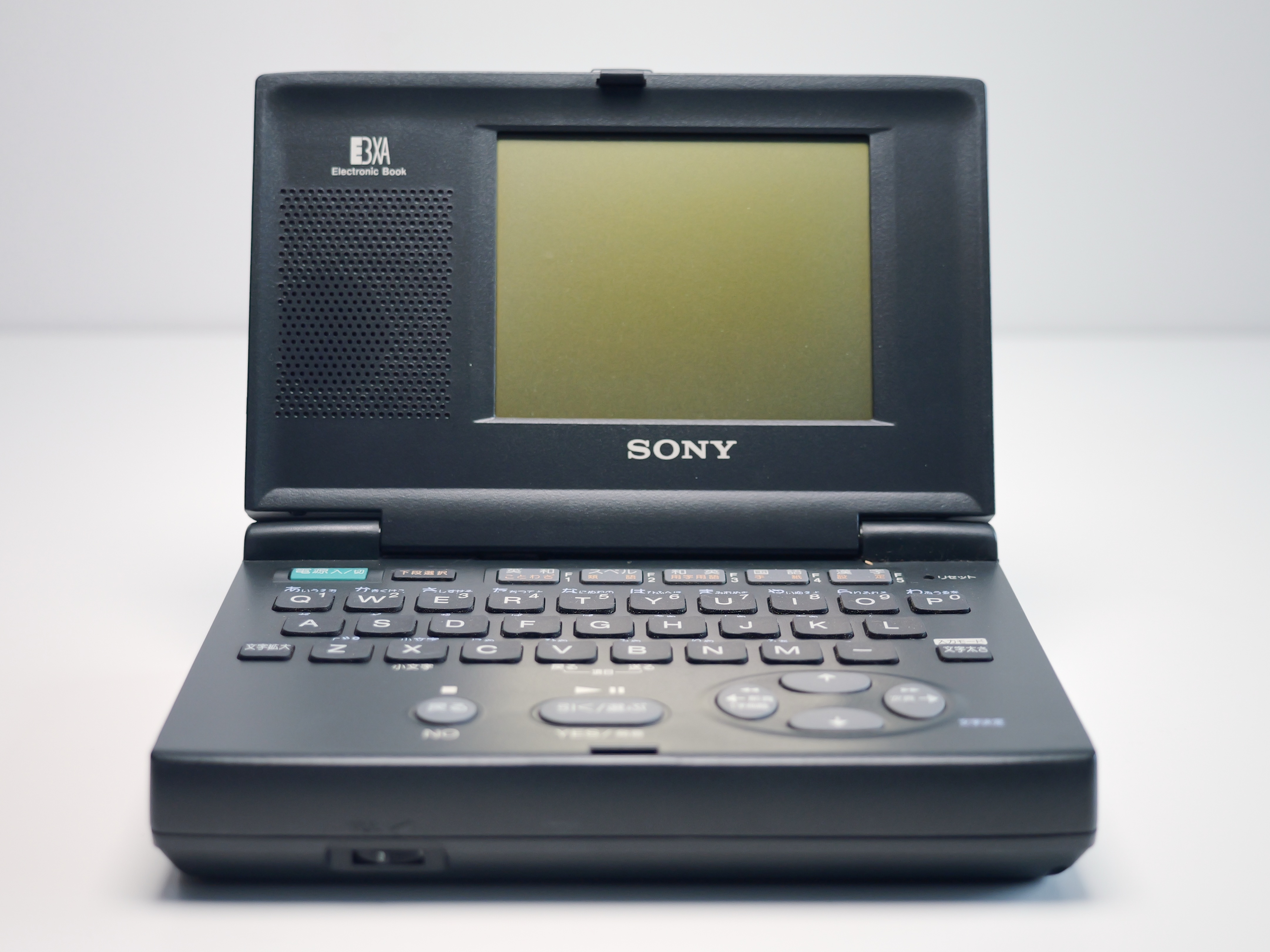
Sony Data Discman DD-85

Released in 1996 and selling for 33,000 JPY, the DD-85 featured a clamshelll design.

=== DD-8 ===
The DD-8 featured a slimmer, rectangular form factor resembling later e-book readers like the Amazon Kindle, departing from the clamshell style used by the DD-1EX and DD-10EX.

=== DDS-35 ===
This was the last model, sold up to 2000.

=== DDS-1000 ===
This model has colour and extended authoring.

=== Sega consoles ===
EB playing software has been released for the Sega Mega CD (Wonder Library / Electronic Book Decoder for X'Eye) and the Sega Saturn (Sega Saturn Electronic Book Operator).

== Legacy ==
While the Data Discman was technologically advanced for its time, high production costs, bulky form factor, and the limited availability of compatible media restricted its global adoption. It remains a notable example of early portable electronic reading technology.

== See also ==
- Sony Multimedia CD-ROM Player – a contemporary portable CD-ROM-based reader by Sony, incompatible with Data Discman media
