= Sony Multimedia CD-ROM Player =

Portable interactive multimedia CD player

- Also known as: Sony Bookman (pre-release name)
- Manufacturer: Sony Corporation
- Type: Electronic book reader, portable media player
- Released: November 1992
- Media: MMCD Player Software (CD-ROM XA-based), CD-DA
- Operating system: MS-DOS 3.21
- CPU: NEC V20HL @ 9.54 MHz
- Memory: 640 KB
- Display: LCD, 300 × 200 pixels with 7 shades of grey, 100 mm (4 in) × 76 mm (3 in)
- Connectivity: Serial port (DE-9)
- Power: Nickel–metal hydride battery: Power draw: 10 V 700 mA
- Dimensions: 44 mm (1.75 in) H 140 mm (5.5 in) W 190 mm (7.5 in) D
- Weight: 1.00 kg (2.2 lb)
- Related: Data Discman

The Sony Multimedia CD-ROM Player was a portable CD-ROM–based multimedia player produced by Sony and released in 1992. It was used to run reference software, such as electronic publications and encyclopedia. Before its release, both Sony representatives and the press referred to the device as the Sony Bookman; that name remained in use in later publications.

The player was sold concurrently with Sony's Data Discman e-book players. Unlike those devices, the MMCD Player could read full-size 120-millimeter CD-ROM discs, including audio CDs. Software format, proprietary to the player, was one of several rich media CD formats released to the market during the early 1990s.

== Overview ==
The MMCD Player has a clamshell form factor with an LCD screen and a QWERTY keyboard, complete with a numeric keypad, four-way navigation pad, "yes" and "no" buttons and a set of function keys (F1 to F5). The keyboard is located on a top of an inner lid which covers a top-loading CD drive.

Discs for the player used the CD-ROM XA sector format and a software format proprietary to the player. Software which the player supported was marked by the "MMCD Player Software" logo (not to be confused with MMCD, a high-density disc format proposal by Sony and Philips). Takashi Sugiyama, Sony Corporation of America's project manager, attributed the MMCD Player's lack of support for established CD-ROM XA–based multimedia formats to its sub-VGA display resolution and the lack of hard drive caching support.

== Software ==
Newsweek chose the Sony MMCD player as a pilot platform for Newsweek InterActive, a quarterly CD-ROM magazine initially published in March 1993. The magazine was later released on compact disks for IBM PC compatible computers. No more than "a few thousand of units" of the MMCD version had reportedly shipped by 1995.

Titles by Compton's NewMedia (a CD-ROM publishing arm of Encyclopædia Britannica, Inc.) and Random House were also available, with some disks including software for both the MMCD Player and computer platforms such as DOS and Windows.

Several companies marketed Sony MMCD Player–based kits to real estate brokers. Digital Data, a company based in Irving, Texas, adapted Austin multiple listing service data as a weekly CD-ROM publication in 1994. In 1995, San Diego–based Visual Display Marketing was pitching their MMCD Player–based product to real estate associations, with its owner Gary Ripsco describe the concept of publishing weekly or biweekly home listing discs.

Microsoft announced support for the MMCD Player for their multimedia authoring tool, Multimedia Viewer, upon the player's introduction on September 16, 1992.

== Reception ==
The Sony MMCD player was introduced the same month as Kodak's Photo CD format and the Tandy VIS multimedia system. Multimedia & Videodisc Monitor described the interactive multimedia landscape as looking "chaotic" and stated that consumers and commercial end users "probably can't" figure out then-current format situation. PC Magazine noted that the introduction of multiple CD-ROM format compatibility logos, along with Sony's MMCD one, make shopping for multimedia titles "anything but simple" and go against the goal of Multimedia PC program.

Later, PC Magazine advised anyone but corporate purchasers "with a driving need to do away with a paper" against buying the Sony MMCD player, criticizing its high price and the incompatibility with other multimedia formats. The Washington Post noted the player's ease of use, comparing it favorably to Walkman compact disk players, but criticized the device's speed and the resolution of its built-in screen.

In a 2006 column, Michael Rogers, who was an editor of the Newsweek Interactive division in the 1990s, said the Sony MMCD player was "far ahead of its time" but "slow as molasses." He noted that, as the device loaded the Newsweek CD-ROM, it took a long time to display the magazine's logo and play the introductory sound bit.
