= Library of the Future =

Collection of texts on CD-ROM

Library of the Future was a collection of public domain texts published on CD-ROM by World Library, Inc. Initially released in 1990, it was one of the first commercial collections of books on CD-ROM. The fourth and final edition was released in 2000 by Ablesoft.

== Development ==
Library of the Future was published by World Library Inc., a company founded by brothers Robert and William Hustwit in Garden Grove, California. The idea for the project after Robert spent days struggling to locate a single quotation of Immanuel Kant in an eight-volume printed text. While he had no formal training in Library Science and did not graduate from college, he was an avid reader and advocate for self-education. He wrote proofreading software to help increase the accuracy of the digitizing process.

The first edition of Library of the Future, released in June 1990, contained 450 works of literature. The second edition, released September 1991, contained 970 texts and over a hundred illustrations.

In November 1991, World Library Inc. released a version of Library of the Future on three discs specifically for the Sony Data Discman. More discs for the Discman were eventually released, with Volume 5 released in 1993.

== Features ==
Library of the Future enabled full-text searching of all included texts, as well as searching by time period, geographic area, or genre. The first edition displayed text in 21 lines at a time with the option to print any number of screens or an entire work. The second edition added a split-screen function to view two works side by side. The program supported a selection of boolean operators to conduct advanced searches.

== Sales and reception ==
By September 1991, World Library Inc. had sold 25,000 copies of Library of the Future.

Estelle Irizarry, in a review of the first edition published in the journal Computers and the Humanities, called Library of the Future "an extraordinary product" for its technological achievement and as a resource for students of literature. However, she was also critical of its lack of a clear "guiding philosophy" or criteria for selection. She also pointed out the lack of a single woman author in the entire collection of 450 texts, though as she notes in an update, nine women authors were included in the second edition.

The second edition received a mostly critical review by Karen Lunsford. She acknowledging the sheer scope of inclusion and accessibility provided by the CD-ROM format, but she highlighted numerous editorial errors, out-of-date translations, and alterations of the original texts. She warned that "[n]o serious scholar or research library should rely upon this disk."

The third edition was criticized by Mark Baechtel of The Washington Post for its loose definition of "literary titles" which included "single poems, essays, plays and orations as well as books," as well as its omission of important works of literature. Baechtel also criticized Library of the Future's claim to be a multimedia product while containing only "12 video clips and a few hundred illustrations of middling quality, none of them easily accessible from within the text. There are no audio files."

Several scholars criticized the collection's lack of bibliographical information about which editions of texts were included.

In 1995, Libraries of the Future was featured in the exhibition The Book and Beyond: Electronic publishing and the art of the book at the Victoria and Albert Museum in London. In 2001, the museum published a website version of their exhibition catalog.
