= Open Library =

Online project for book data of the Internet Archive

- Screenshot Open Library homepage in September 2011
- Website type: Digital library index
- Available in: English, Czech, German, French, Croatian, Italian, Portuguese, Telugu, Chinese, Ukrainian
- Founders: Aaron Swartz, Brewster Kahle, Alexis Rossi, Anand Chitipothu, and Rebecca Hargrave Malamud
- Revenue: Donation
- Website: openlibrary.org
- Commercial: No
- Registration: Free
- Launched: 2006; 20 years ago
- Current status: Active
- Content license: Data: public domain; Source code: AGPLv3

Open Library is an online project intended to create "one web page for every book ever published". Created by Aaron Swartz, Brewster Kahle, Alexis Rossi, Anand Chitipothu, and Rebecca Hargrave Malamud, Open Library is a project of the Internet Archive, a nonprofit organization. It has been funded in part by grants from the California State Library and the Kahle/Austin Foundation. Open Library provides online digital copies in multiple formats, created from images of many public domain, out-of-print, and in-print books.

== Book database and digital lending library ==
Its book information is collected from the Library of Congress, other libraries, and Amazon.com, as well as from user contributions through a wiki-like interface. If books are available in digital form, a button labeled "Read" appears next to its catalog listing. Digital copies of the contents of each scanned book are distributed as encrypted e-books (created from images of scanned pages), audiobooks and streaming audio (created from the page images using OCR and text-to-speech software), unencrypted images of full pages from OpenLibrary.org and Archive.org, and APIs for automated downloading of page images. Links to where books can be purchased or borrowed are also provided.

There are different entities in the database:

- authors
- works (which are the aggregate of all books with the same title and text)
- editions (which are different publications of the corresponding works)

Open Library claims to have over 20 million records in its database. Copies of the contents of tens of thousands of modern books have been made available from 150 libraries and publishers for ebook controlled digital lending. Other books including in-print and in-copyright books have been scanned from copies in library collections, library discards, and donations, and are also available for lending in digital form. In total, the Open Library offers copies of over 1.4 million books for what it calls "digital lending", but critics have called distribution of digital copies a violation of copyright law.

== History ==
Open Library began in 2006 with Aaron Swartz as the original engineer and leader of the Open Library's technical team. The project was led by George Oates from April 2009 to December 2011. Oates was responsible for a complete site redesign in 2010. In 2015, the project was continued by Giovanni Damiola and then Brenton Cheng and since 2016 has been directed by Mek Karpeles.

Its codebase is on GitHub. The site uses Infobase, its own database framework based on PostgreSQL, and Infogami, its own Wiki engine written in Python. In late 2025, some of the original web.py server components were re-written in FastAPI. The source code to the site is published under the GNU Affero General Public License.

== Book sponsorship program ==
In the week of October 21, 2019, the Open Library website introduced a Book Sponsorship program, which according to Cory Doctorow, "lets you direct a cash donation to pay for the purchase and scanning of any books. In return, you are first in line to check that book out when it is available, and then anyone who holds an Open Library library card can check it out.". The feature was developed by Mek Karpeles, with assistance by Tabish Shaikh, and other members of the community.

== Books for the blind and dyslexic ==
The website was relaunched adding ADA compliance and offering over one million modern and older books to the print disabled in May 2010 using the DAISY Digital Talking Book. Under certain provisions of United States copyright law, libraries are sometimes able to reproduce copyrighted works in formats accessible to users with disabilities.

== Copyright violation accusations ==
The Open Library has justified its ability to offer full contents of books in digital formats as part of the first-sale doctrine and fair use law. The Open Library owns a physical copy of each book that they have made available, and thus argue that the lending out of one digital scan of the book in a controlled manner falls within the first-sale doctrine, a practice known as controlled digital lending and in use by multiple public and academic libraries.

Since its launch, the Open Library has been accused of mass copyright violation by numerous groups, including the American Authors Guild, the British Society of Authors, the Australian Society of Authors, the Science Fiction and Fantasy Writers of America, the US National Writers Union, and a coalition of 37 national and international organizations of "writers, translators, photographers, and graphic artists; unions, organizations, and federations representing the creators of works included in published books; book publishers; and reproduction rights and public lending rights organizations". The UK Society of Authors threatened legal action in 2019 unless the Open Library agreed to cease distribution of copyrighted works.

=== Hachette v. Internet Archive ===
The Open Library further came under criticism from several authors and publishers groups when it created the National Emergency Library in response to the COVID-19 pandemic in March 2020. Under these circumstances, the National Emergency Library removed the waitlists of all books in its Open Library collection and allowed any number of digital copies of a book to be downloaded as an encrypted file that would be unusable after two weeks, asserting that this unlimited borrowing was a reasonable exception under the national emergency to allow educational functions to continue since physical libraries and bookstores were forced to be shuttered. The Authors Guild, the Association of American Publishers, the National Writers Union, and others argued that this allowed unlimited copyright infringement and denied revenues from distribution of authorized digital copies of books to authors who also needed relief during the COVID-19 national emergency. Though the Open Library asserted that the copies of entire books in e-book format were still encrypted and the unlimited borrowing was for educational purposes, the National Writers Union asserted that images of each page of each book could still be accessed on the Web without encryption or other controls.

Four major publishers—Hachette, Penguin Random House, John Wiley & Sons, and HarperCollins, all members of the Association of American Publishers—filed a lawsuit in the Southern New York Federal District Court against the Internet Archive in June 2020, asserting the Open Library project violated numerous copyrights. In their suit, the publishers claimed "Without any license or any payment to authors or publishers, [the Internet Archive] scans print books, uploads these illegally scanned books to its servers, and distributes verbatim digital copies of the books in whole via public-facing websites. With just a few clicks, any Internet-connected user can download complete digital copies of in-copyright books from [the] defendant." The publishers were represented by the law firms Davis Wright Tremaine and Oppenheim + Zebrak. The Internet Archive ended the National Emergency Library on June 16, 2020, instead of the intended June 30 date, and requested the publishers to "call off their costly assault". In July 2022, both parties filed requests for summary judgement. A first hearing was held on March 20, 2023. A summary judgement was issued March 24, 2023, in favour of the plaintiffs. In its ruling the United States District Court for the Southern District of New York determined that the Internet Archive committed copyright infringement by scanning and distributing copies of books online. Stemming from the creation of the National Emergency Library (NEL) during the onset of the COVID-19 pandemic, publishing company Hachette Book Group alleged that the Open Library and the National Emergency Library facilitated copyright infringement.

On March 25, 2023, the court ruled against Internet Archive, who appealed the decision. This appeal was later denied by the Second Circuit Court of Appeals in 2024.

A settlement was reached in 2025 for an undisclosed amount that also resulted in the removal of 500,000 books among other content from Open Library.

== See also ==
- Free-software license
- Google Books
- LibraryThing
- List of software under the GNU AGPL
- List of digital library projects
- Online public access catalog
- Project Gutenberg
- WorldCat
