= James Mustich Jr. =

American bookseller, editor, and writer

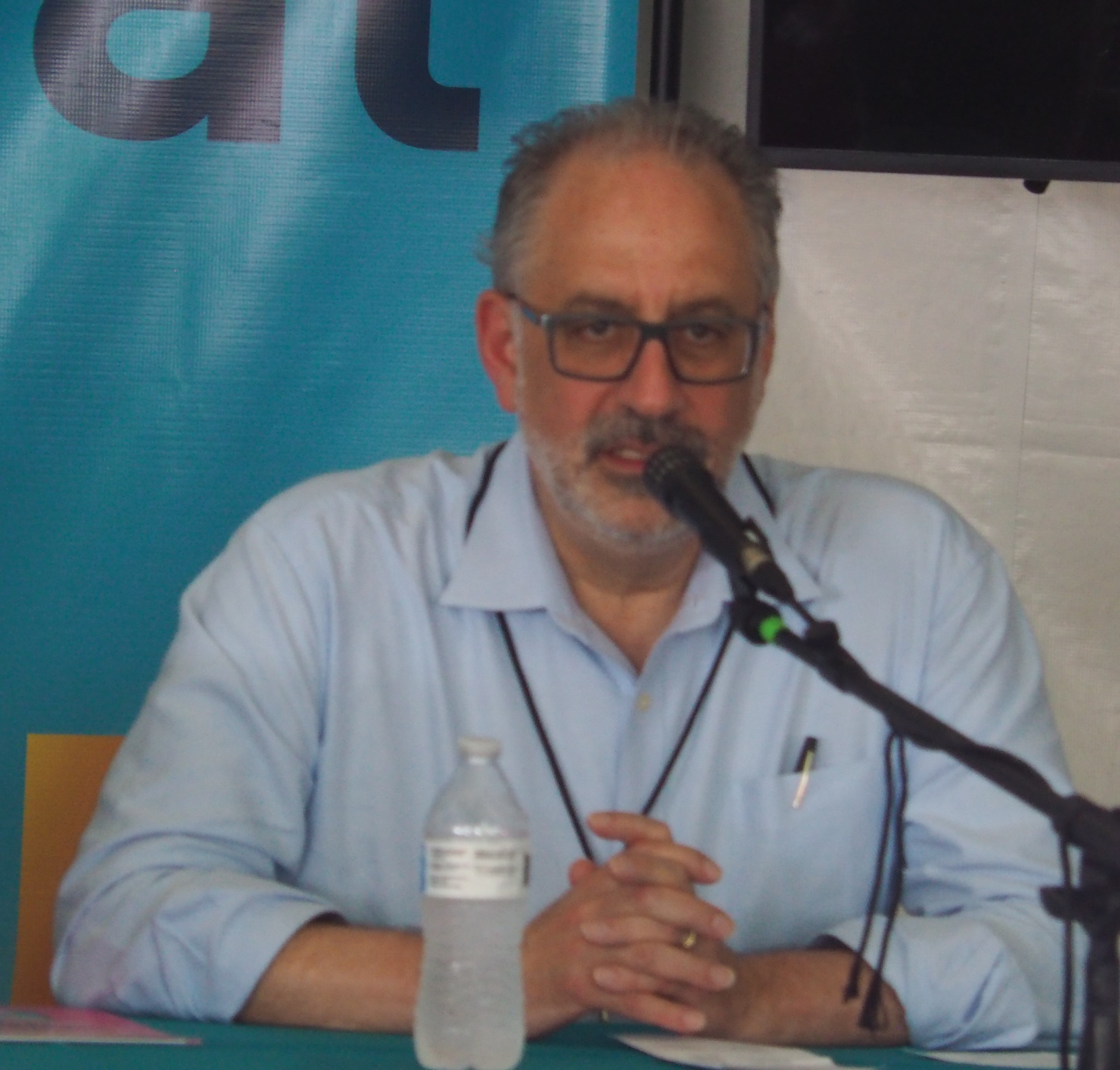
- Education: Princeton University (BA)
- Writing career
- Notable work: 1,000 Books To Read Before You Die: A Life-Changing List

James Mustich Jr. is a bookseller, editor, and writer. In October 2018, Mustich's book 1,000 Books To Read Before You Die: A Life-Changing List was published by Workman Publishing, receiving starred reviews from Publishers Weekly, Booklist, and Library Journal, as well as the praise of other notable independent reviewers. The Washington Post listed it as one of the 50 best nonfiction books of the year.

== Biography ==
Mustich graduated from Princeton University magna cum laude in 1977. He married Margot Greenbaum, who was a year below him at Princeton, in 1986.

In 1986, Mustich co-founded the mail-order book catalog A Common Reader': Books for Readers with Imagination', and served as its president and publisher until the business was closed in 2006. During its two-decade run, the catalog was published up to 17 times each year and listed hundreds of titles in each issue, each with its own write-up. A Common Reader circulated to hundreds of thousands of readers and at its peak sold over 300,000 books a year. Its in-house imprint, Akadine Press, republished over 60 out-of-print books by such authors as Lillian Beckwith, Alice Thomas Ellis, Barbara Holland, Reynolds Price, and John Ciardi.

In 2007, Mustich was founding editor of the Barnes & Noble Review, an online literary journal. As editor of the Review he has conducted in-depth interviews with many leading authors, including Philip Roth, Salman Rushdie, Philip Pullman, Chimamanda Ngozi Adichie, Neal Stephenson, Richard Price, Elmore Leonard, Azar Nafisi, and Robert Caro.

In 2017, Mustich became the founding executive producer of the Barnes & Noble Podcast, for which he has conducted interviews with writers such as Questlove, Nassim Nicholas Taleb, Lidia Bastianich, Steven Pinker, and Michael Wolf.
