= Barnes & Noble =

American bookseller and retailer

Barnes & Noble Booksellers

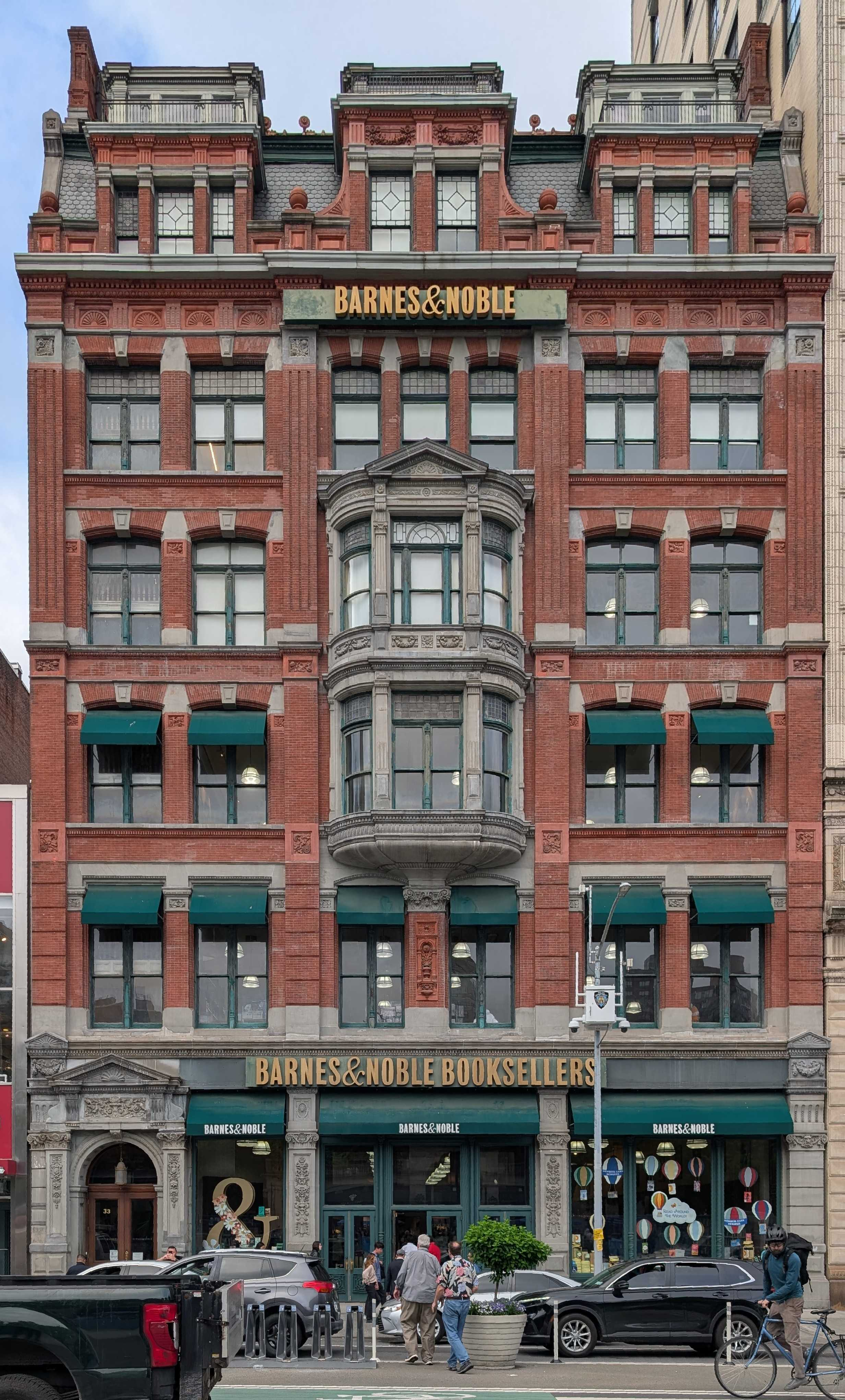
- Barnes & Noble's current flagship store and corporate office at, Union Square, Manhattan, New York City (2025)
- Type: Private
- ISIN: US0677741094
- Industry: Bookselling
- Predecessor: Arthur Hinds & Company
- Founded: 1886; 140 years ago (as Arthur Hinds & Company) in New York City, U.S.
- Founders: Charles M. Barnes; William Barnes; G. Clifford Noble; Leonard Riggio
- Headquarters: 33 E. 17th Street, New York City, U.S.
- Number of locations: Approx. 600 (As of 2026)
- Area served: United States
- Key people: James Daunt (CEO)
- Products: Books, maps, CDs, DVDs, toys, games, stationery, calendars, gift packs, magazines, board games, encyclopedias
- Brands: Nook; Paper Source; SparkNotes; Barnes & Noble Booksellers; Nook Digital, LLC; Sterling Publishing
- Revenue: ▼US$3.552 billion (FY 2019)
- Operating income: ▲US$38.596 million (FY 2019)
- Net income: ▼US$3.769 million (FY 2019)
- Total assets: US$1.705 billion (FY 2019)
- Total equity: US$444.497 million (FY 2019)
- Owner: Elliott Investment Management
- Number of employees: 24,000 (2019)
- Parent: Waterstones (Note: Through its subsidiary Waterstones Barnes & Noble Limited)
- Website: www.barnesandnobleinc.com (corporate site); www.barnesandnoble.com (consumer site)

Barnes & Noble Booksellers is an American bookseller with the largest number of retail outlets in the United States. The company operates approximately 600 retail stores across the United States.

Barnes & Noble operates mainly through its Barnes & Noble Booksellers chain of bookstores. The company's headquarters are at 33 E. 17th Street on Union Square in New York City.

As a result of a series of mergers and bankruptcies in the American bookstore industry since the 1990s (notably the liquidation of their main competitor Borders), Barnes & Noble has become the United States' largest bookstore chain and the only national chain. Previously, Barnes & Noble operated the chain of small B. Dalton Bookseller stores in malls until they announced the liquidation of the chain in 2010. The company was also one of the nation's largest manager of college textbook stores located on or near many college campuses when that division was spun off as a separate public company called Barnes & Noble Education in 2015.

The company is known by its customers for large retail outlets, many of which contain a café serving Starbucks coffee and other consumables. Most stores sell books, magazines, newspapers, DVDs, graphic novels, gifts, games, toys, music, and Nook e-readers and tablets. The company offers publishing and self-publishing services.

== History ==
=== 19th century: foundations ===
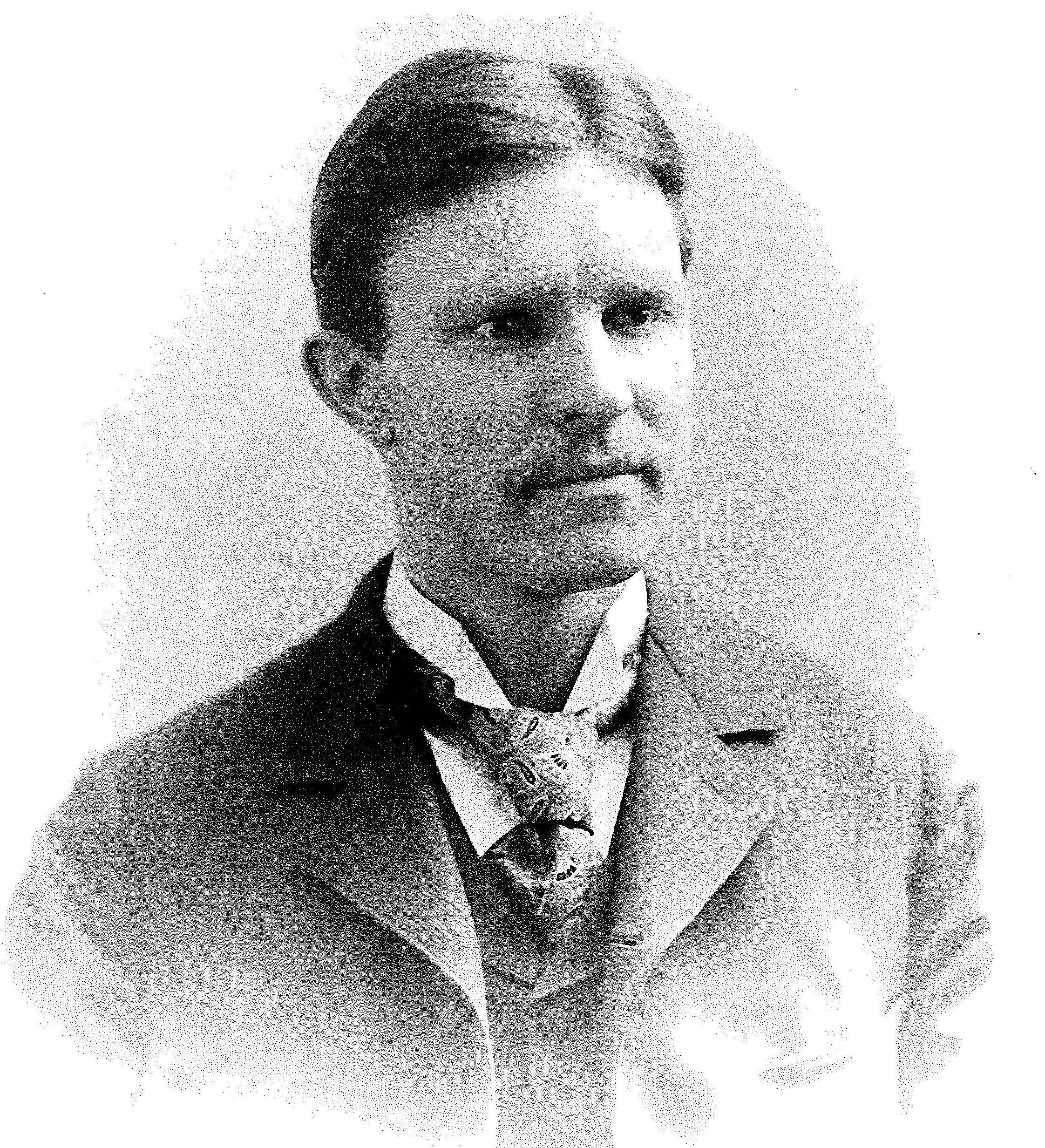
Clifford Noble in 1893

A major part of what would become Barnes & Noble was founded in 1886 as a bookstore called Arthur Hinds & Company, located at 4 Cooper Institute in the Cooper Union Building in New York City. In the fall of 1886, Gilbert Clifford Noble from Westfield, Massachusetts, who had graduated from Harvard College earlier that year, was hired to work there as a clerk.

In 1894, Noble was made a partner, and the name of the shop was changed to Hinds & Noble.

=== 20th century: expansion ===
==== 1900–1919 ====
In 1901, Hinds & Noble moved to 31–35 W. 15th Street. In 1917, Noble bought out Hinds and entered into a partnership with William Barnes, son of his friend Charles Barnes; the name of the store was changed to Barnes & Noble soon after. Charles Barnes had previously founded an Illinois bookstore in 1873 that would later evolve into the Follett Corporation after William Barnes left the company. Barnes and Noble's official history cites this 1873 Illinois bookstore founding as part of its history.

==== 1920–1939 ====
In 1930, Noble sold his share of the company to William Barnes's son, John Wilcox Barnes. Noble died on June 6, 1936, at the age of 72. In 1932, at the height of the Great Depression, the bookstore moved its flagship location to 18th Street and Fifth Avenue, which served as the company's flagship location until its closure in 2014. The Noble family retained ownership of an associated publishing business, and Barnes & Noble opened a new publishing division in 1931.

==== 1940–1959 ====
In 1940, the store was one of the first businesses to feature Muzak. It underwent a major renovation the following year. That decade, the company opened stores in Brooklyn and Chicago. William Barnes died in 1945, at the age of 78, and his son John Wilcox Barnes assumed full control. The company underwent a significant expansion between the 1950s and the 1960s, opening an additional retail store on 23rd Street in Manhattan, as well as shops near the City University of New York, Harvard, and other Northeast college campuses.

==== 1960–1979 ====
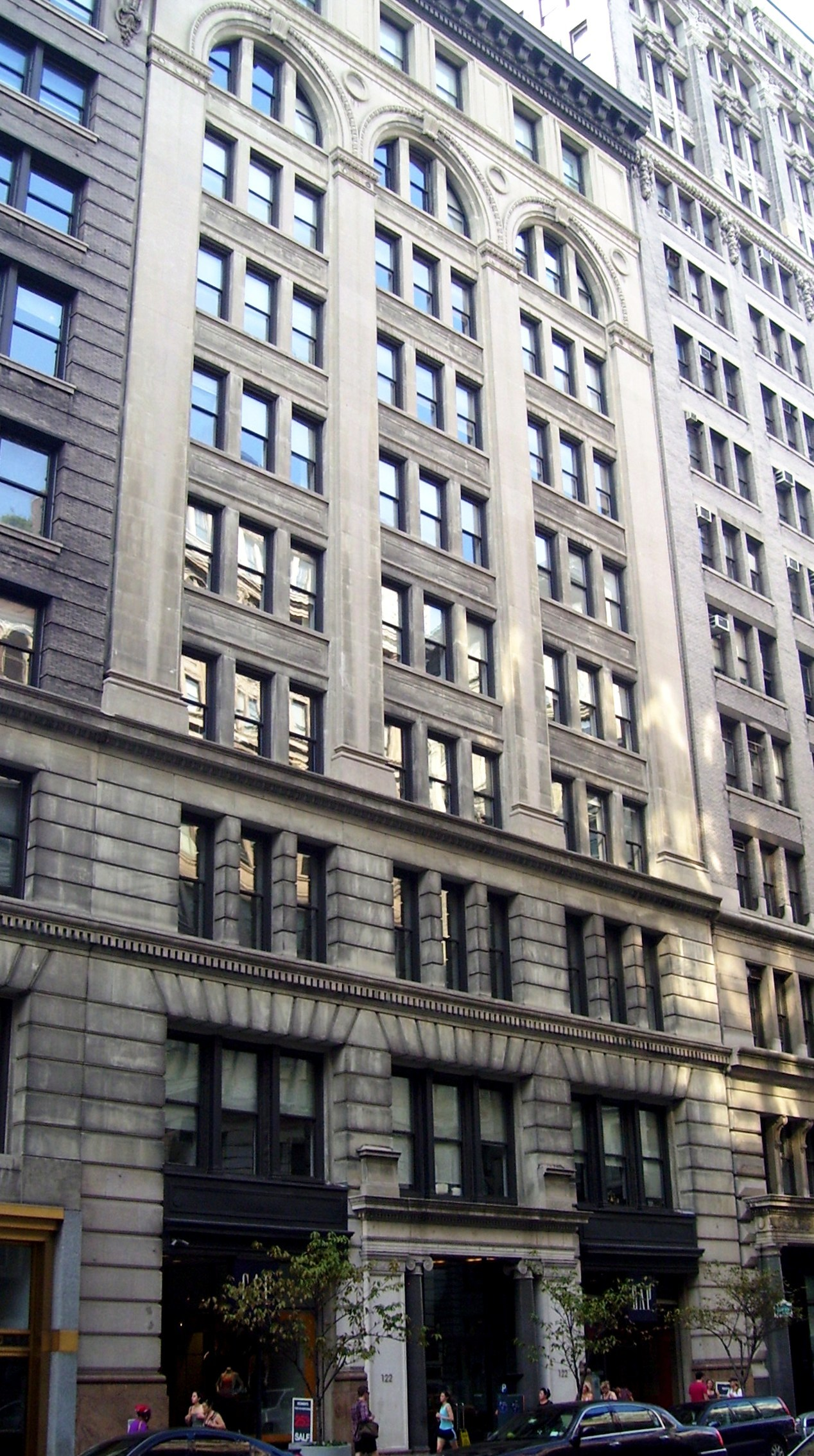
Barnes & Noble old corporate headquarters, on Fifth Avenue in the Flatiron District neighborhood of Manhattan, New York City

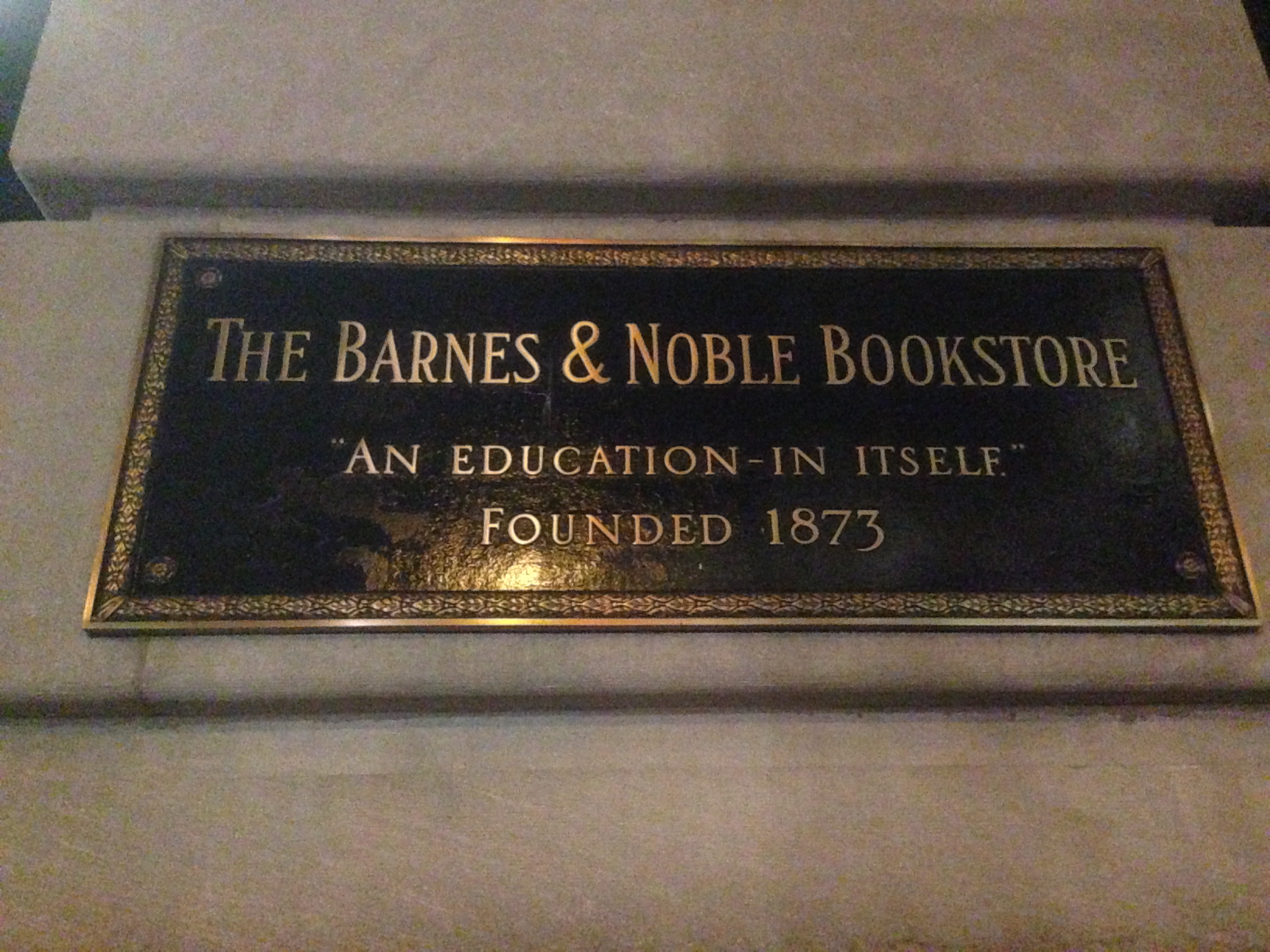
5th Avenue store sign

John Barnes died in 1964, and the company was sold to the conglomerate Amtel two years later. The business was purchased in 1971 by Leonard Riggio, who has been credited as one of the founders, for $1.2 million. By then, it consisted only of "a significantly reduced wholesale operation and a single retail location—the flagship store at 105 Fifth Avenue." The publishing operation was sold separately by Amtel to Harper & Row. In 1974, Barnes & Noble became the first bookstore chain to advertise on television, and a year later, the company became the first bookseller in the United States to discount books, by selling The New York Times best-selling titles at 40% off the publishers' list price. Between the 1970s and the 1980s, Barnes & Noble opened smaller discount stores, which were eventually phased out in favor of larger stores. They also began to publish their own books to be sold to mail-order customers. These titles were primarily affordable reissues of out-of-print titles and selling them through mail-order catalogs allowed Barnes & Noble to reach new customers nationwide.

In November 1974, editors of the British-produced Guinness Book of Records, claimed on the BBC One television program Record Breakers that the Fifth Avenue store of Barnes & Noble had overtaken that of London's Foyles bookshop to become the world's biggest bookstore.

==== 1980–1999 ====
Barnes & Noble continued to expand throughout the 1980s, and it purchased the primarily shopping mall-based B. Dalton chain from Dayton Hudson in 1986, for an estimated $275 million to $300 million. Solveig Robinson, author of The Book in Society: An Introduction to Print Culture, wrote that the purchase "gave [Barnes & Noble] the necessary know-how and infrastructure to create what, in 1992, became the definitive bookselling superstore." The acquisition of the 797 B. Dalton bookstores turned the company into a nationwide retailer, and by the end of fiscal year 1999, the second-largest online bookseller in the United States. B&N's critics claim that it has contributed to the decline of local and independent booksellers. The last B. Dalton stores ceased operations in January 2010.

In 1989, Barnes & Noble purchased the 22-store chain Bookstop.

In September 1993, Barnes & Noble became a publicly traded company by issuing $77 million worth of stock on the New York Stock Exchange under the BKS ticker symbol. The company remained on the stock exchange until competition from Amazon decreased their stock value and in August 2019, Elliott Management purchased all of the company's stock and took the company private.

Before Barnes & Noble created its official website, it sold books directly to customers through mail-order catalogs. It first began selling books online in the 1980s through an early videotex service called "Trintex", a joint venture between Sears and IBM, but the company's website was not launched until May 1997. BarnesandNoble.com went public in 1999.

=== 2000s ===
Barnes & Noble logo used from 1999 until 2019. A modified version of this logo with a straightened ampersand was used from 2019 until 2020.

In 2004, it was reported that the reading of books was on the decline in America, with the number of non-reading adults increasing by 17 million between 1992 and 2002. Despite this, Barnes & Noble said that its retail store business was expanding in the book market. Beginning in 1999, Barnes & Noble owned GameStop, a video game and electronics retail outlet. The company distributed its shares in GameStop in late 2004, spinning it off into its own company in an attempt to simplify its corporate structure.

CEO Leonard Riggio stepped down in 2002, naming his younger brother, and former acting chief executive of BarnesandNoble.com, Stephen Riggio, to succeed him. Some corporate governance experts noted that this appointment could cause a conflict of interest, but the company board noted that Riggio's experience at the company made him the right person for the job. Stephen Riggio stepped down from the position in 2010.

=== 2010s ===
In 2010, website president William Lynch was named CEO. He began development toward the company's electronic book store and the introduction of its electronic book reader, the Nook. Steve Riggio stayed on as vice chairman. When Lynch resigned in mid-2013, he was replaced by Chief Financial Officer Michael Huseby early the next year. Following the spinoff of Barnes & Noble Education, Huseby departed to head the new firm; his place was filled in mid-2015 by Ronald Boire, who departed one year later. Demos Parneros was named Barnes & Noble's Chief Executive Officer in April 2017 after having joined the company as Chief Operating Officer in November 2016; however, he was fired in July 2018 for "company policy violations" without severance and was immediately removed from the company's board, at the advice of a law firm hired by Barnes & Noble. On August 28, 2018, Parneros filed a lawsuit against Barnes & Noble, claiming wrongful termination.

After the bankruptcy and closure of its chief competitor, Borders, in 2011, Barnes & Noble became the last remaining national bookstore chain in the United States. This followed a series of mergers and bankruptcies in the American bookstore industry since the 1990s, which also saw the demise of Waldenbooks, Barnes & Noble's own subsidiary B. Dalton, and Crown Books, among others. Barnes & Noble's largest physical bookstore rival is now Books-A-Million, which does not operate in the Western US. Barnes & Noble also faces competition from general retailers, especially from Amazon.com, and from regional and independent booksellers. Amazon has even opened its own physical bookstores, once again creating a second national bookstore chain.

Barnes & Noble began reducing its overall presence in the 2010s, closing its original flagship store in early 2014. In mid-2014, the company announced it would separate its Nook Media division from its retail store division.

In 2018, the company closed 400 of its retail locations, as its business seemed to be going through a decline. In February 2018, Barnes & Noble permanently laid off 1,800 full time employees at an annual cost savings of $40 million per year. According to TechCrunch, the company essentially fired their entire full time staff at all their stores, who would be making an average of $22,000 per year (~$11 per hour), and were replaced by part time workers earning close to minimum wage. In the 2018 fiscal year that ended in July, the company's overall losses reached $17 million.

Some media accounts noted the retail chain's apparent loss of focus, with one article noting:

While it's easy to blame Barnes & Noble's troubles on Amazon.com, the fact is the book industry has been on a roll. According to the American Booksellers Association, a trade group representing independent bookshops, year-to-date sales through August 6 actually rose 5% among its member sellers.

A visit to Barnes & Noble's flagship New York store in Union Square may offer some clues. The CD and DVD sections, which still occupy a sizable chunk of store space, are often deserted and unmanned whenever I visit, most recently Wednesday night. The same goes for the Nook area, which, despite displays of some Nook devices, was mostly taken up by an array of other items like yoga mats and Brookstone weighted blankets.

Elsewhere in the store, alongside bestsellers, signed copies and books sorted by category are more examples of mismatched merchandise: journals, toys, candles and diffuser sets, tea and chocolate selections. In the kids' area, backpacks and other school merchandise were marked 50% off among the expanded toy aisles. The café traffic also showed little sign of helping drive sales elsewhere in the store. At the end of the visit, one couldn't help but wonder: What does Barnes & Noble stand for, and what does it want to be?

In early July 2018, Barnes & Noble fired CEO Demos Parneros for an unspecified violation of company policy, which it was later revealed was based upon sexual harassment claims. It accused Pareneros of breaching his duties of loyalty and good faith and acting as a "faithless servant" by sexually harassing the female employee, bullying subordinates, and attempting to "sabotage" a potential acquisition of the New York-based company, and asserted that the company should therefore be entitled to claw back his salary, bonus, and other benefits during the period of his "disloyal conduct".

On October 3, 2018, the board of directors announced that they would entertain offers to buy the company. Among the potential buyers was Leonard Riggio, who owned at the time approximately 19% of Barnes & Noble stock. As a result of the news, the company's stock price jumped by nearly 30%.

In August 2019, Elliott Investment Management acquired the company for approximately $683 million with James Daunt, the managing director of London-based Waterstones Booksellers Ltd., becoming CEO. James Daunt was to become CEO of both Waterstones and Barnes & Noble and was to relocate from London to New York. On August 7, 2019, Barnes & Noble became a privately held, wholly owned subsidiary of Elliott.

In March 2020, Barnes & Noble announced that it would temporarily stop selling magazines and, likewise temporarily, close 400 of its 620 stores due to the COVID-19 pandemic. Approximately 12 Barnes & Noble stores had closed completely following Elliott Advisors' takeover of the company. Daunt announced intentions to overhaul the acquisition procedure, opting for centralized and reduced initial frontlist orders compared to previous years. In 2021, the company acquired Paper Source.

=== Retail resurgence in 2020s ===
In April 2022, The New York Times reported the company used the temporary closure of stores during the pandemic to refurbish them, and credited Daunt with turning around sales both in store and online. During the COVID-19 pandemic, Barnes & Noble saw up to a 500% increase in graphic novel and manga sales.

As of 2023 Barnes & Noble was the biggest national chain of bookstores in the United States. It has over 660 retail stores, with locations in all 50 states. It operates 700 college bookstores, and has more than 34,000 full-time employees. Its retail store in Union Square in New York City is the second-biggest bookstore in the USA.

In 2023 the CEO, James Daunt fostered a new approach to retail, allowing stores greater autonomy in choosing their layout, and also making them more similar to independent stores, in atmosphere and in layout. The Wall Street Journal cited Daunt's background running Daunt Books, an independent bookseller in the UK, as one major basis for his approach as CEO to new strategies for developing the retail business. Daunt encouraged Barnes & Noble buyers to limit the scope of their research, cut out "boring" and "tedious" books, and source books primarily from larger publishing houses; many indie publishers alleged that their business was dropped and they lost contact with Barnes & Noble buyers after Daunt became CEO. The article asserted "The idea behind the new Barnes & Noble is to make the national chain more like a collection of 596 local indies. The famous one in my neighborhood [Upper West Side of Manhattan] used to symbolize the company's past. Now it offers a peek at its future. 'If we can do it here,' Daunt said, 'we can do it anywhere.' "

The company's retail operations had a major expansion in 2023, and it moved ahead with plans to open thirty new stores.

The company opened 60 new locations in 2024. Media accounts cited coverage on social media and by influencers as one reason for Barnes & Noble's popularity and success.

In an article entitled "Barnes & Noble is making a comeback," CNN noted that the new CEO James Daunt had implemented a strategy with the physical storefronts that involved curating each store's selection, leading to a reported 7% increase in traffic.

In June 2024, the company announced the purchase of The Tattered Cover, a small Denver-based independent chain of bookstores, for $1.83M. The deal kept the current branding, locations, and most employees. The sale was approved by a bankruptcy court in July 2024.

In September 2025, Barnes & Noble announced it would acquire San Francisco Bay Area chain Books Inc. for $3.25 million. Books Inc. had filed for Chapter 11 bankruptcy in January 2025.

In 2026, Barnes & Noble announced its plans to open sixty new stores. The CEO, James Daunt, stated that he would not be opposed to Barnes & Noble selling AI-written books as long as they "[don't] pretend to be something else and [aren't] ripping off somebody else," and there is customer demand for them.

== Publishing ==
Barnes & Noble maintained a separate publishing business in addition to its retail stores and other entities. Barnes & Noble's publishing company got its start by reissuing inexpensive versions of out-of-print books, and made a push to expand the unit in 2003. The company saw success the following year; in September 2004, its book, Hippie, reached The New York Times Best Seller list.

Barnes & Noble often published and sold books at a lower cost than competitors, and sold lines of inexpensive books like Barnes & Noble Classics and the leather-bound Barnes & Noble Collectible Classics collection which it had published since 1992. In addition, the company had a second paperback series called the Barnes & Noble Library of Essential Reading. Barnes & Noble's edition of The Gentle Art of Verbal Self-Defense by Suzette Haden Elgin, sold over 250,000 copies, and its reissued edition of The Columbia History of the World by John Garrity, sold over 1 million copies.

In 2022, Barnes & Noble rebranded its publishing operations as "Union Square & Company". In 2024, Barnes & Noble announced the sale of the publishing company to Hachette Book Group.

The company has expanded business by acquiring several firms over the years, including J.B. Fairfax International in 1999, SparkNotes, an educational website and publishing company, in 2001 and Sterling Publishing (later renamed Union Square & Co) in 2003.

== Food service in retail stores ==
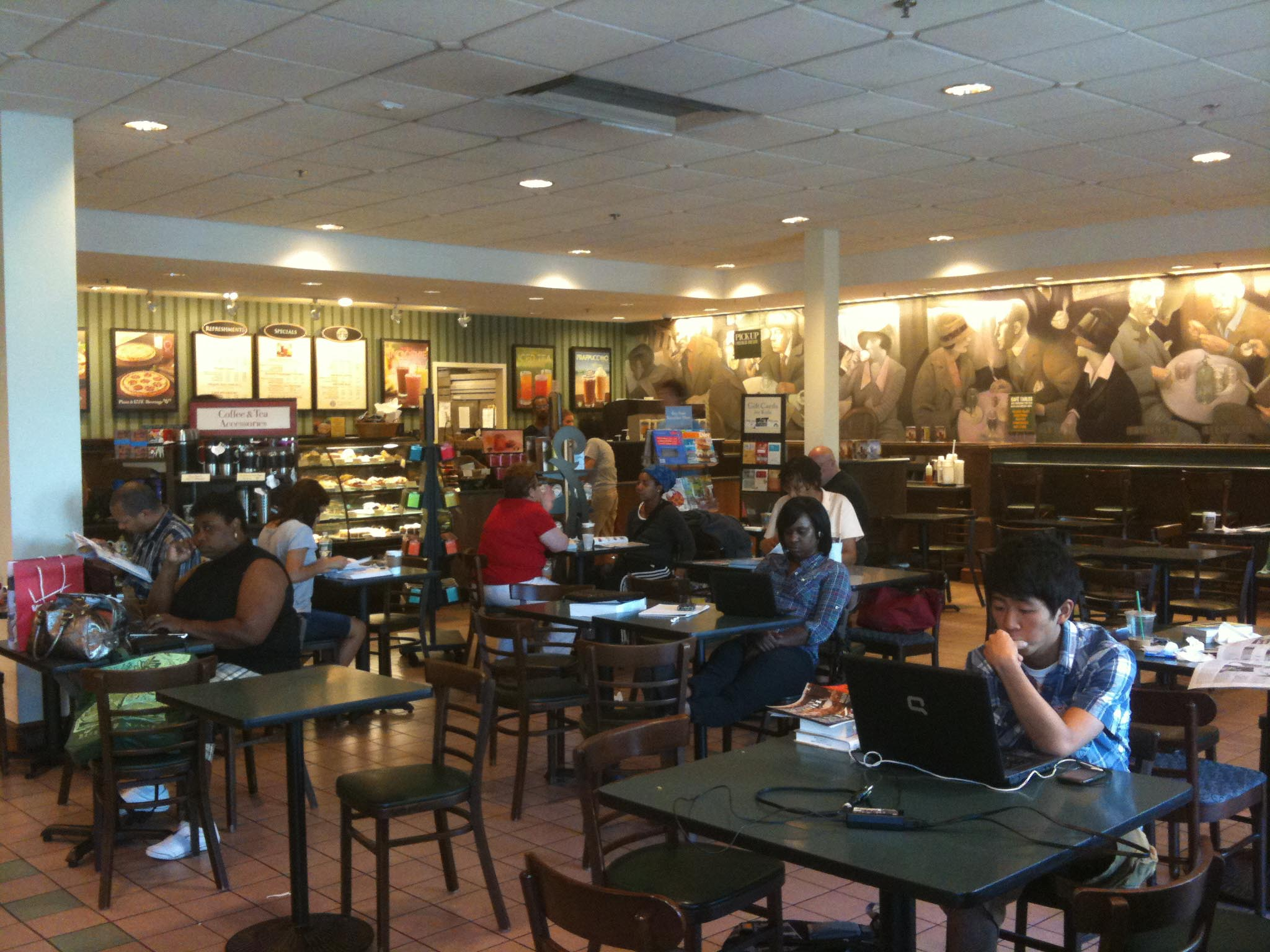
The Barnes & Noble café in Springfield, New Jersey. This location was closed in 2023 and moved to Union Township.

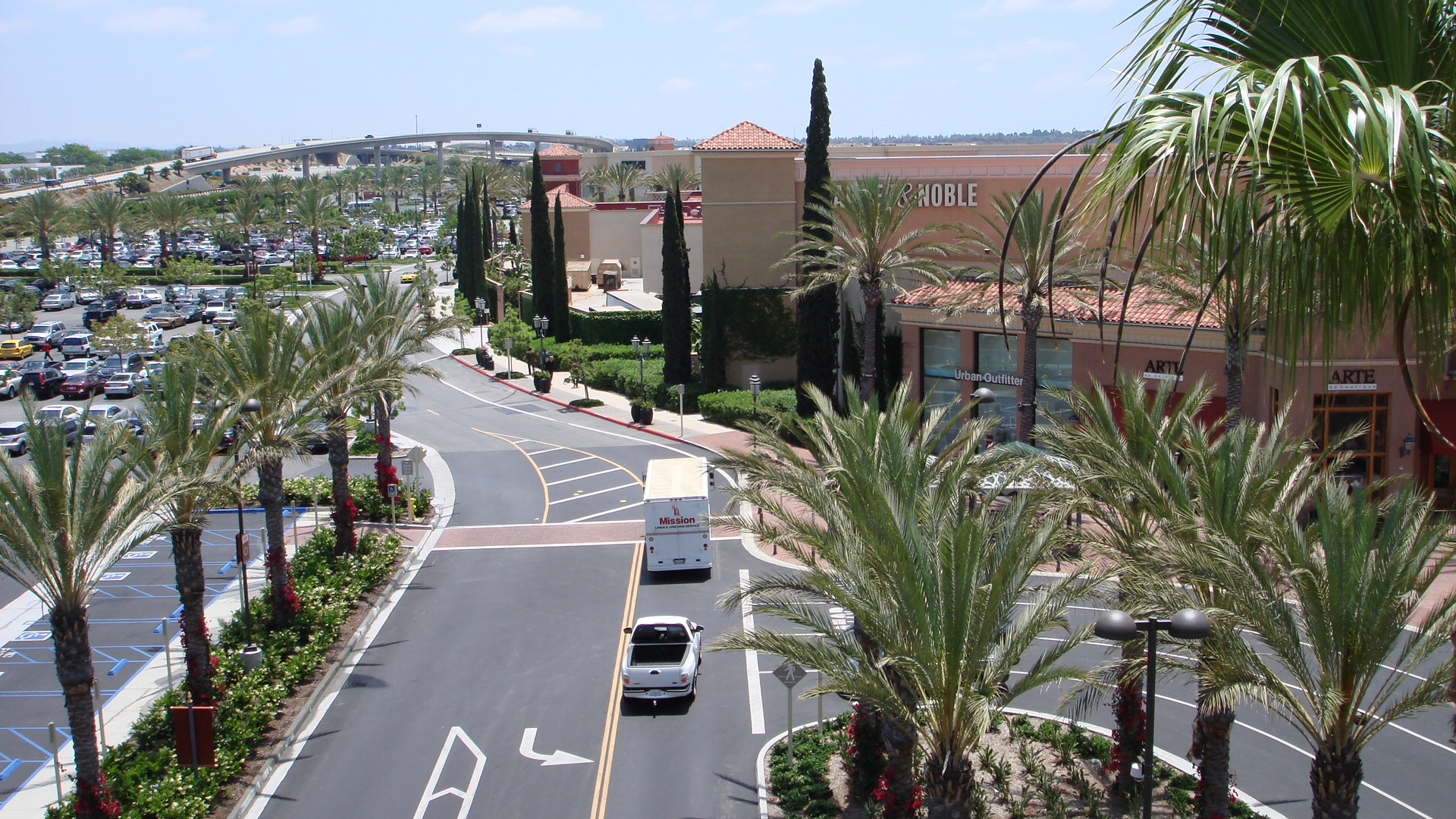
View of the store at Irvine Spectrum in 2006

In 1993, Barnes & Noble signed an agreement to serve Starbucks coffee in each of its existing and future cafes. In 2004, Barnes & Noble began offering Wi-Fi in the café area of selected stores, using SBC FreedomLink (now the AT&T Wi-Fi network). All stores offered Wi-Fi as of 2006 and as of July 27, 2009, Wi-Fi is offered for free to all customers.

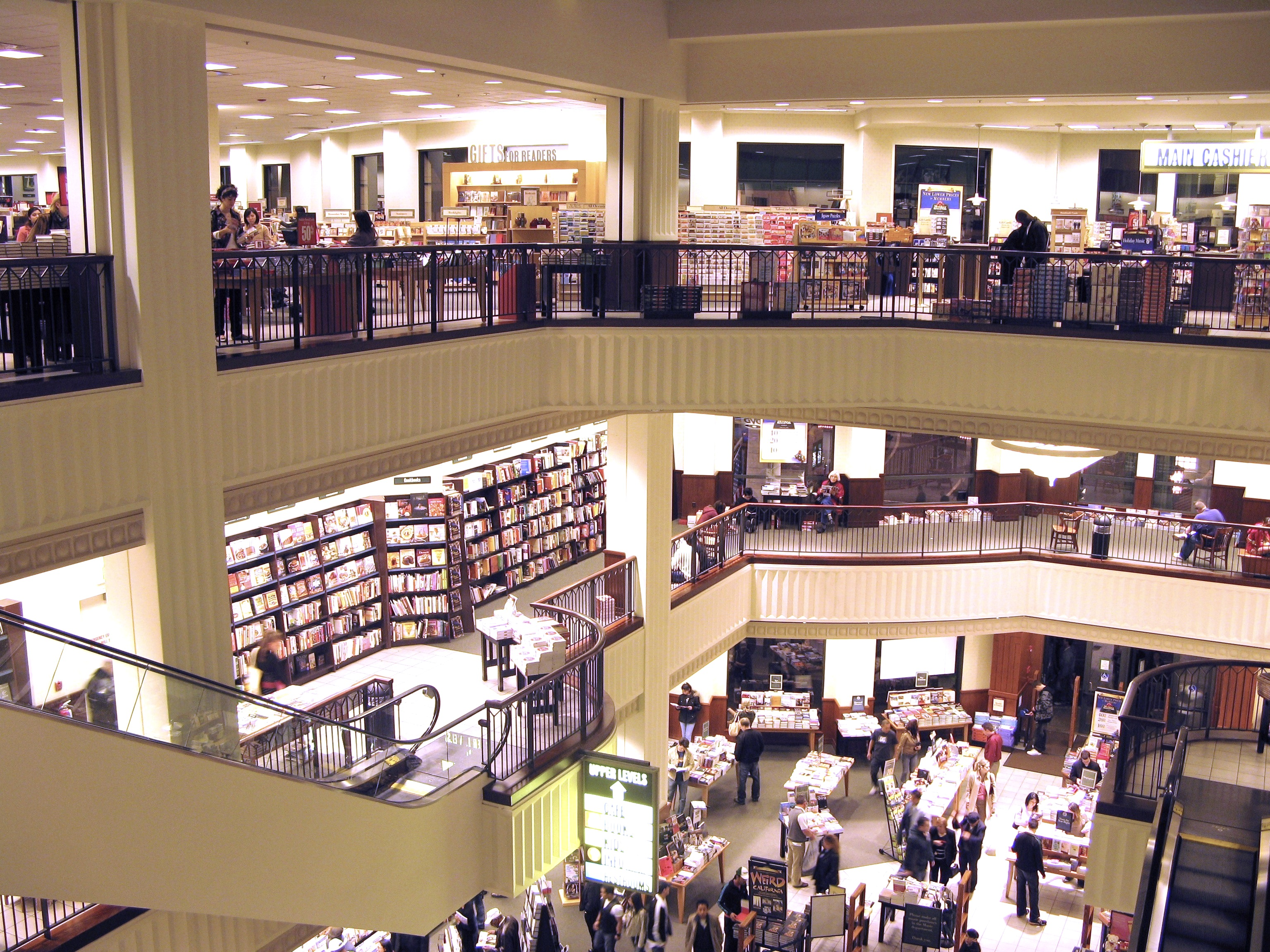
The Barnes & Noble at The Grove at Farmers Market, Los Angeles

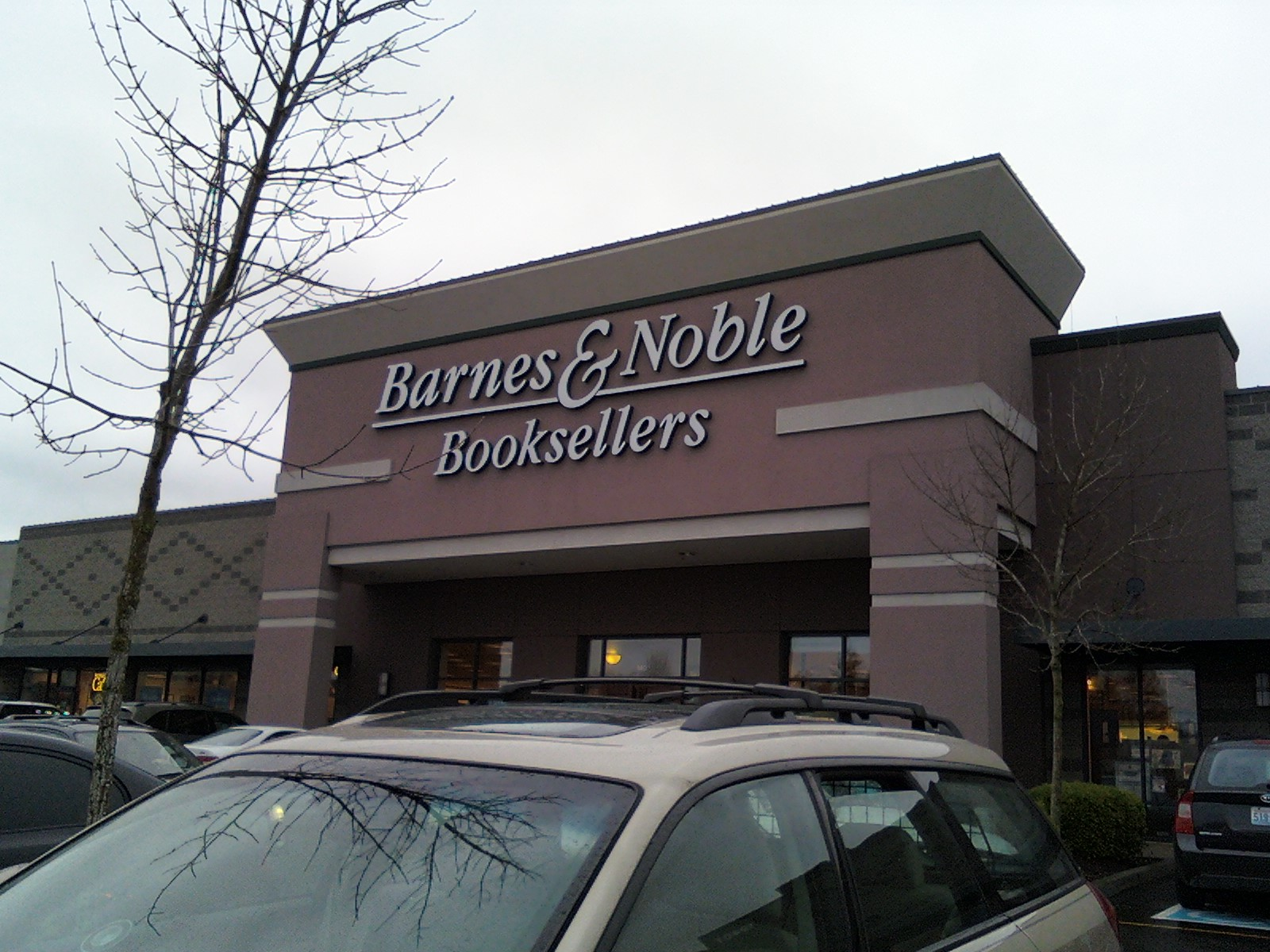
Barnes & Noble in Lynnwood, Washington, using the former 1990s logo

In 2016, Barnes & Noble announced plans to open four concept stores in 2017 that featured cafés twice the size of its usual food spots, as well as bars offering wine and beer. Restaurants would also include a waitstaff and a full menu for breakfast, lunch, and dinner. The restaurants were expected to revive sales growth. Company executives planned to open additional concept stores if sales met expectations. The first stores were opened in Scarsdale, New York; Edina, Minnesota; Plano, Texas; and Folsom, California.

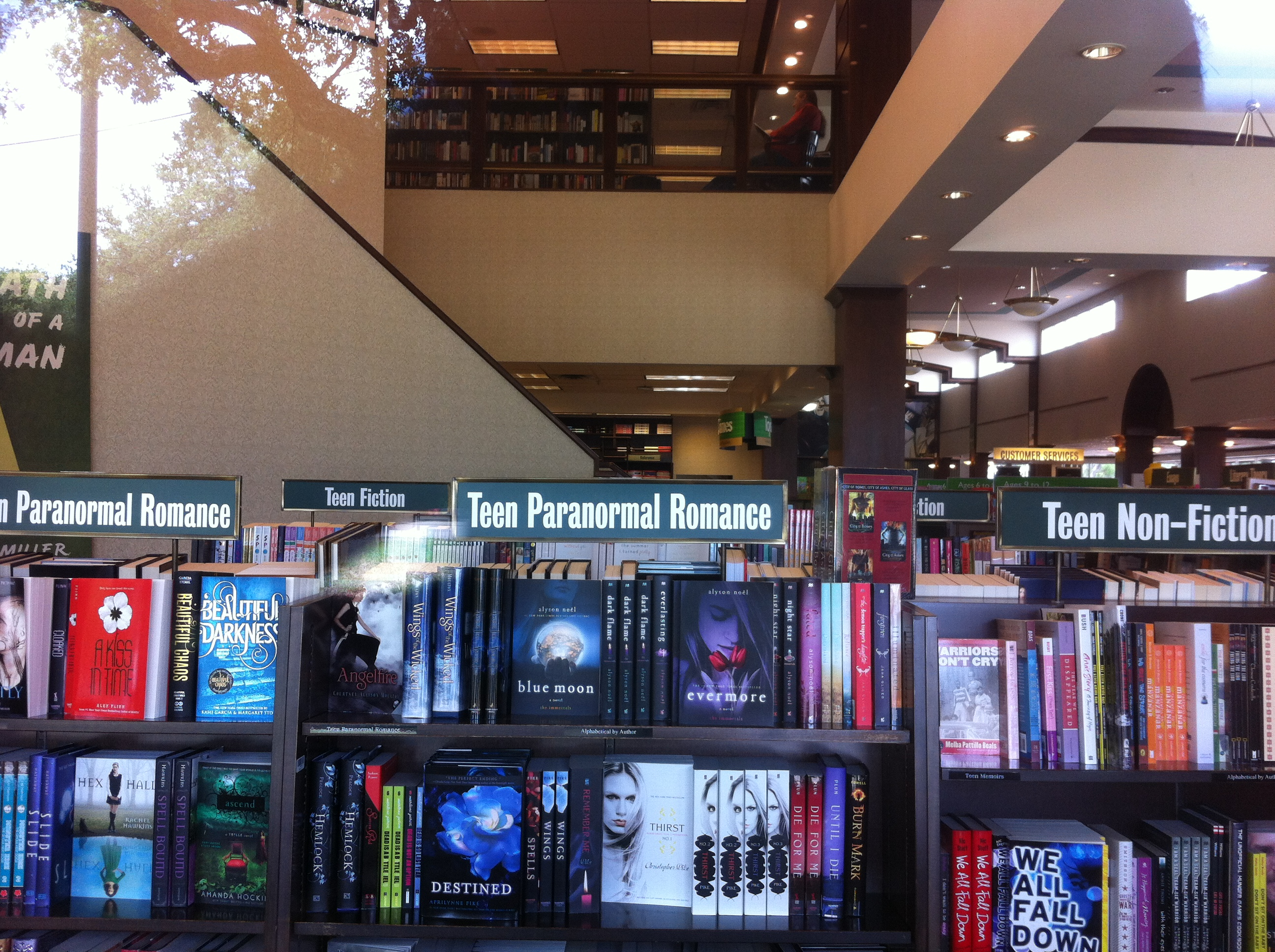
The teen paranormal romance section at Barnes & Noble, Austin, TX.

== Community involvement ==
Barnes & Noble hires community business development managers to engage in community outreach. The Barnes & Noble located in Fairbanks, Alaska, gave over $80,000 to the community between 2015 and 2018 through book fair fundraising programs. To promote nationwide literacy among 1st through 6th graders and encourage more reading and learning during the summer, Barnes & Noble has implemented a summer challenge.

== The Barnes & Noble Review ==
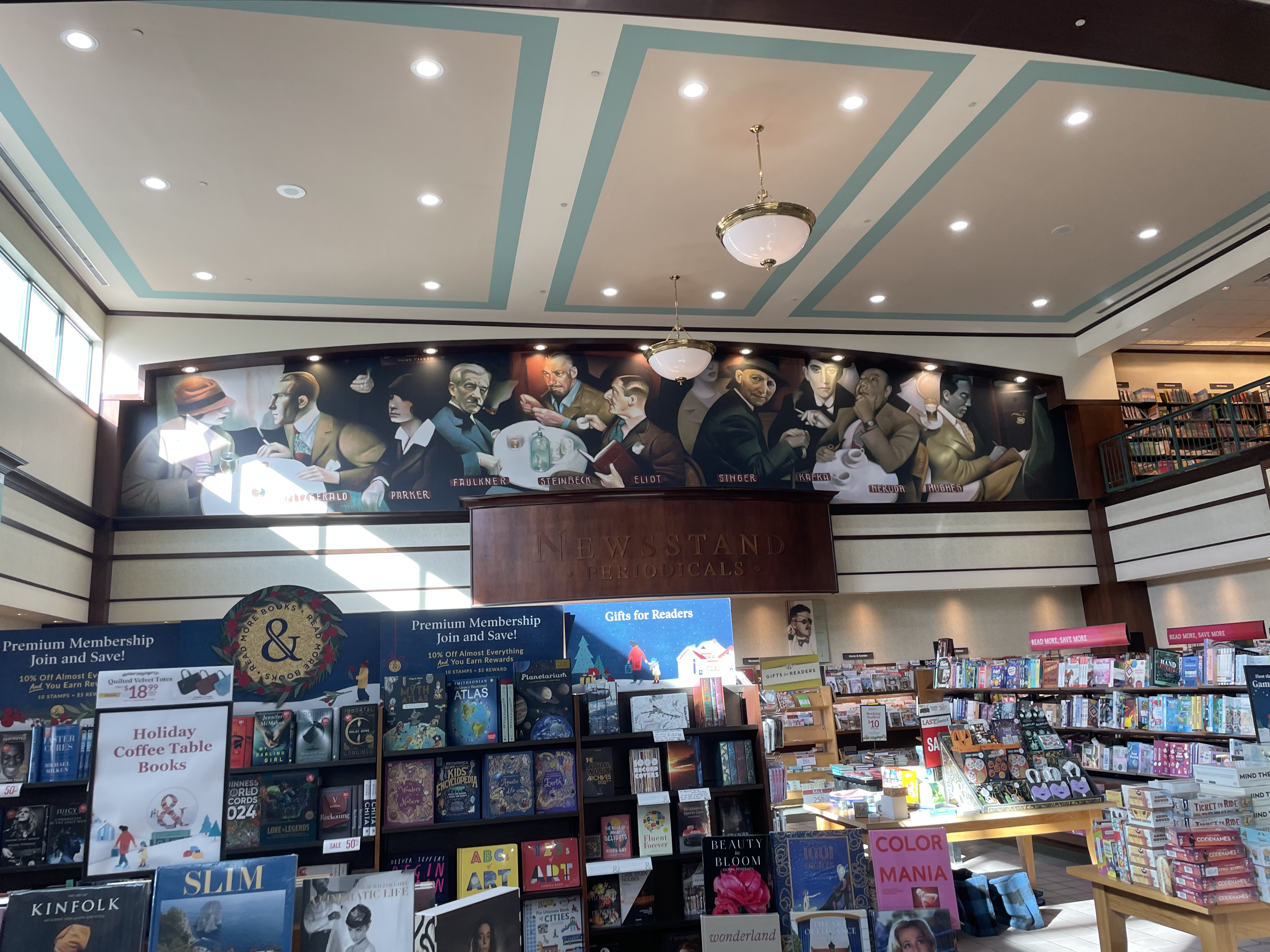
Barnes & Noble mural at Kendall, Florida

The Barnes & Noble Review was an online magazine, hosted on Barnes & Noble's website, that published evaluations of both fiction and nonfiction works, along with essays, interviews, and pieces on other topics. It was launched in October 2007 by Barnes & Noble CEO Steve Riggio and James Mustich Jr., publisher of the book catalog A Common Reader. Regular contributors to the magazine have included book critics Michael Dirda, Brooke Allen, Laura Miller, and Adam Kirsch, as well as prominent writers in fields outside of literary criticism, such as political journalists Chris Hayes and Ezra Klein, philosopher A. C. Grayling, music critic Robert Christgau, and cartoonist Ward Sutton. Miller, who has written for Salon and Mustich's Common Reader, said, "The reviews [at BNR] are the same as anywhere else", adding that the tone and length of the pieces evoke The New York Times Book Review rather than the less formal Salon. The magazine's web traffic flourished during its first few years. According to Compete.com, it amassed 50,000 unique visitors in December 2009.

Some critics were originally skeptical of The Barnes & Noble Review. Art Winslow, former literary editor of The Nation, said that because Barnes & Noble is a brand name, BNR's contributors are effectively endorsing the corporation, and that the motives behind the publication undermine its integrity: "Criticism's content should be free of any commercialism. Barnes & Noble has found another way to sell books, and that's the Review. ... I wouldn't write there." Mustich disputed the idea that the magazine serves as a corporate tactic: "We counter that skepticism with quality. If people read the site, they can determine that we are doing what we purport to do. They have never tried to influence my judgment. The first attempt would have been the last."

== Barnes & Noble Nook ==
Barnes & Noble Nook (styled NOOK) is a suite of e-book readers developed by the company, based on the Android platform. The first device was announced in the United States on October 20, 2009, and was released November 30, 2009, for $259. On June 21, 2010, Barnes & Noble reduced the Nook's price to $199, as well as launched a new Wi-Fi-only model, for $149, and released a Nook colored touch screen for $249.

The Nook competes with the Amazon Kindle, Kobo eReader, and other e-reader offerings and color tablets with reading apps, such as Apple's iBooks for iOS devices. Various Nook models feature a 6-inch, 7-inch, or larger touchscreen. Version 1.3 of the Nook introduced Wi-Fi connectivity, a web browser, a dictionary, chess, and sudoku games, and a separate, smaller color touchscreen that serves as the primary input device. The Nook also features a Read in Store capability that allows visitors to stream and read any book for up to one hour while shopping in a Barnes & Noble bookstore. According to a June 2010 CNet article, the company planned to expand this feature to include periodicals in the near future. The color version of the Nook introduced a 7-inch color touchscreen and the ability to view at a portrait or landscape orientation.

On April 30, 2012, Microsoft invested $300 million for a 17.6% stake in Nook, which valued the business at about $1.7 billion.

In November 2012, the technology publications Mashable and Techdirt criticized the license agreement with which Barnes & Noble sells ebooks to consumers, pointing out that the rights to re-download a purchased ebook expire when the customer's credit card expires, and a valid credit card must be added to the account to restore this functionality.

In June 2014, Barnes & Noble had previously announced that it would spin off its Nook Digital division into a separate publicly traded company, but as of 2016, Nook remains a part of Barnes & Noble. That same month, the company announced a partnership with Samsung Electronics to make Nook tablets, as the bookseller moved forward with plans to revamp its digital business. Samsung and Barnes & Noble introduced the Samsung Galaxy Tab 4 Nook 7.0 in August 2014, followed by the Samsung Galaxy Tab 4 Nook 10.1 in October 2014. In December 2014, Barnes & Noble announced that it had ended its Nook partnership with Microsoft by buying back its stake. Samsung and Barnes & Noble continue to introduce new Nook tablets.

In March 2016, Barnes & Noble announced it would close the Nook App Store and Nook Video and in the UK close the Nook Store on March 15. The company continues to sell e-books as well as digital magazines and newspapers in the US.

In 2021, the company announced the release of a new 10-inch Android-based tablet, which is named the Nook 10" HD, in a partnership with Lenovo, the manufacturer of the device.

== College bookstores spin-off ==
Barnes & Noble formerly had a subsidiary, Barnes & Noble College Booksellers, that specialized in operating campus bookstores at colleges and university. While these stores also sell standard Barnes & Noble products, they are specifically dedicated to textbook sales. In 2015, the college operations were spun off into a new separate company, Barnes & Noble Education, now doing business as BNED.

== See also ==
- Book magazine, which Barnes & Noble partnered for thirty-one issues through to the end of 2003, and its demise
- Book Stacks Unlimited
- List of book distributors
- List of bookstore chains
- List of group-0 ISBN publisher codes
