= The Common Reader =

The Common Reader may refer to:

- A Common Reader, a mail order catalogue
- The Common Reader, two essay collections by Virginia Woolf
- The Common Reader, a journal of the essay, a publication of Washington University in St. Louis.
