= Demos Parneros =

American businessman (born 1962)

Personal details
- Born: March 10, 1962 (age 64) Cyprus
- Education: New York University
- Profession: Businessman

Demos Parneros is an American businessman, currently leading CityPark Investments LLC as an advisor and investor in retail and consumer businesses. He was previously the chief executive officer of Barnes & Noble and president of North American retail and online at Staples Inc.

== Early life ==
Born in Cyprus, Parneros moved to New York City when he was nine years old. He graduated from New York University with a Bachelor of Science degree in management.

== Career ==
Parneros began his career at Macy's Inc. and then held multiple management positions at Staples before joining Barnes & Noble in November 2016.

=== Staples ===
Parneros joined Staples in 1987 as general manager of its first store in New York City and worked in the company's human resources, marketing, merchandising and store operations divisions. In 2002, Parneros was appointed president of the company's U.S. Superstores and responsibility for over 1,000 locations. In 2012, Parneros was appointed president of Staples North American Stores’ 1,800 locations and the company's online business, Staples.com. Under Parneros, Staples launched its first omnichannel stores, customer kiosks that merged the company's retail and online product offerings.

=== KeyBank ===
Parneros served on the board of KeyBank from 2014 to 2018.

=== Barnes & Noble ===
Parneros was appointed chief operating officer of Barnes & Noble in November 2016. In April 2017, he was appointed CEO, with responsibility for all company operations, including brick-and-mortar stores, merchandising, e-Commerce, publishing, IT systems and real estate. At the time, Barnes & Noble was searching for effective ways to compete with Amazon and strengthen its retail and digital Nook businesses. While the brick-and-mortar bookstore market stabilized, the company continued to experience sales and revenue declines. As part of Parneros’ turnaround strategy, Barnes & Noble designed and opened smaller store locations and refocused on book sales.

In 2019, the company opened its first five prototype stores, half the size of the traditional stores, to align with its omnichannel sales approach. Parneros was terminated in July 2018 for alleged violation of company policies. Parneros subsequently sued Barnes & Noble for breach of contract and defamation. In October 2020, Barnes & Noble and Parneros agreed to amicably settle the case with all claims dropped.

=== Office Depot/OfficeMax ===
In 2025, Parneros joined the Retail Advisory Board for Office Depot/OfficeMax (an Atlas Holdings Portfolio Company), providing guidance for a nationwide retail network of more than 800 stores and 15,000 associates.

In November of 2026, he announced he joined Office Depot/Office Max as President of the retail business

=== Consulting and Investing ===
Parneros leads CityPark LLC, an investment and advisory firm focused on retail and consumer businesses. He has invested in and advised early- and growth-stage companies in retail technology, digital commerce, and customer experience, and serves as a board advisor to several portfolio companies. He has also partnered with venture firms, including XRC Ventures and Super Angel Fund, to support startups in these sectors.

In addition to his board roles, Parneros advises private equity firms and companies on strategy, due diligence, and operational transformation.
