= A Common Reader =

Defunct American mail-order book catalog

A Common Reader: Books for Readers with Imagination was an American mail-order book catalog, established in 1986 by James Mustich Jr., a bookseller, editor, and writer. It was notable among general-interest book catalogs for its eclecticism, with large sections of each issue given over to obscure literary classics.

The catalog was named in honor of Virginia Woolf's two-volume collection of essays, entitled The Common Reader (1925) and The Second Common Reader (1932), which collected her lectures and writings about the nature of reading and how best to approach it.

A Common Reader's in-house publishing imprint, the Akadine Press, initiated in 1996, republished over 60 out-of-print books by authors such as Lillian Beckwith, Alice Thomas Ellis, Barbara Holland, Reynolds Price, and John Ciardi.

A Common Reader was published up to 17 times a year, with a readership in the tens of thousands. Each edition listed an average of 700 books, accompanied by editorial write-ups. At its peak, A Common Reader sold over 300,000 titles per year.

The business closed in January 2006, to the regret of many readers who appreciated its discerning finds and well-written précis.
