= Lillian Beckwith =

English writer

- Beckwith's publicity photograph
- Born: 1916
- Died: 3 January 2004 (aged 87)
- Occupation: Novelist

Lillian Beckwith (25 April 1916 – 3 January 2004), real name Lillian Comber, was an English writer best known for her series of semi-autobiographical books set on the Inner Hebrides.

Born Lilian Lloyd in Ellesmere Port, Cheshire, she married Edward Comber in 1937, and in 1942 she moved with him to Elgol, Isle of Skye, under doctor's orders for a rest. Moving to the nearby and smaller Isle of Soay, she eventually bought and ran her own croft. Her life on the island provided the basis for seven books published between 1959 and 1978, although allegedly, some of her neighbours later felt that the somewhat comical characters on Beckwith's fictional island of Bruach were too close to real persons, causing Beckwith to become something of a persona non grata in her former home. She moved to the Isle of Man in 1962 and died on 3 January 2004 aged 87.

== Bibliography ==
=== Skye series ===
- 1959 - The Hills is Lonely — Chapter 1, Review
- 1961 - The Sea for Breakfast — Chapter 1
- 1964 - The Loud Halo Chapter 1

(The above titles were published collectively in A Hebridean Omnibus, 1987)

- 1968 - A Rope - In Case — Chapter 1
- 1973 - Lightly Poached — Chapter 1
- 1976 - Beautiful Just! — Chapter 1

(The above titles were published collectively in A Second Hebridean Omnibus, 1991)

- 1978 - Bruach Blend — Chapter 1, Review

All were illustrated by Douglas Hall.

All are also available as audiobooks narrated by Hannah Gordon.

Beckwith also wrote a book entitled About my Father's Business (1971), about her childhood in her father's grocery shop.

=== Novels ===
- 1967 - Green Hand
- 1974 - The Spuddy (Illustrated by Victor Ambrus)
- 1984 - A Shine of Rainbows — Chapter 1 (adapted into a film- A Shine of Rainbows).
- 1986 - A Proper Woman
- 1989 - The Small Party
- 1992 - An Island Apart — Chapter 1, (audiobook narrated by Vivien Heilbron)
- 2002 - A Breath of Autumn — Chapter 1

A collection of short stories :

- 1988 Bay of Strangers — Title story

And a cookery book :

- 1976 Hebridean Cook Book
