= Microsoft Office 2010 =

2010 version of Microsoft Office

- Clockwise from top left: Word, Excel, Outlook and PowerPoint
- Developer: Microsoft
- Release: June 15, 2010; 16 years ago
- Final release: Service Pack 2 (14.0.7268.5000) / October 13, 2020; 6 years ago
- Operating system: Windows XP SP3 or later Windows Server 2003 SP2 or later
- Platform: IA-32, x64
- Predecessor: Microsoft Office 2007 (2007)
- Successor: Microsoft Office 2013 (2013)
- Available in: 40 languages
- List of languages English, Arabic, Bulgarian, Chinese (Simplified), Chinese, Croatian, Czech, Danish, Dutch, Estonian, Filipino, Finnish, French, German, Greek, Hebrew, Hindi, Hungarian, Italian, Japanese, Kazakh, Korean, Latvian, Lithuanian, Norwegian (Bokmål), Polish, Portuguese (Brazil), Portuguese (Portugal), Romanian, Russian, Serbian, Slovak, Slovenian, Spanish, Swedish, Thai, Turkish, Ukrainian
- Type: Office suite
- License: Trialware
- Website: Microsoft Office 2010 (Archived at Wayback Machine)

Microsoft Office 2010 (codenamed Office 14) is a version of Microsoft Office for Microsoft Windows unveiled by Microsoft on May 15, 2009, and released to manufacturing on April 15, 2010, with general availability on June 15, 2010. The macOS equivalent, Microsoft Office 2011 for Mac was released on October 26, 2010.

Office 2010 introduces user interface enhancements including a Backstage view that consolidates document management tasks into a single location. The ribbon introduced in Office 2007 for Access, Excel, Outlook, PowerPoint, and Word is the primary user interface for all applications in Office 2010 and is now customizable. Collaborative editing features that enable multiple users to share and edit documents; extended file format support; integration with OneDrive and SharePoint; and security improvements such as Protected View, a sandbox to protect users from malicious content are among its other new features. It debuted Office Online, free Web-based versions of Excel, OneNote, PowerPoint, and Word. A new Office Starter 2010 edition replaces Microsoft Works. Office Mobile 2010, an update to Microsoft's mobile productivity suite was released on May 12, 2010 as a free upgrade from the Windows Phone Store for Windows Mobile 6.5 devices with a previous version of Office Mobile installed.

Office 2010 is the first version of Office to ship in a 64-bit version. It is also the first version to require volume license product activation. Office 2010 is compatible with Windows XP SP3 and Windows Server 2003 SP2 through Windows 10 v1809 and Windows Server 2019. It is the last version of Microsoft Office to run on Windows XP SP3, Windows Server 2003 SP2, Windows Vista SP1+ and Windows Server 2008.

Reviews of Office 2010 were generally very positive, with praise to the new Backstage view, new customization options for the ribbon, and the incorporation of the ribbon into all programs. Sales, however, initially were lower than those of its predecessor. Despite this, Office 2010 was a success for Microsoft, surpassing the company's previous records for adoption, deployment, and revenue for Office. As of December 31, 2011, approximately 200 million licenses of Office 2010 were sold, before its discontinuation on January 31, 2013.

Mainstream support for Office 2010 ended on October 13, 2015, and extended support ended on October 13, 2020, the same dates that mainstream and extended support ended for Windows Embedded Standard 7. Office 2010 is the last version of Office that can be activated without enrolling in a Microsoft account; enrollment for activation is required starting with Office 2013. On June 9, 2018, Microsoft announced that its forums would no longer include Office 2010 or other products in extended support among its products for discussions involving support. On August 27, 2021, Microsoft announced that Outlook 2010 and Outlook 2007 would be cut off from connecting to Microsoft 365 Exchange servers on November 1, 2021.

== History and development ==
Development started in 2007 while Microsoft was finishing work on Office 12, released as Microsoft Office 2007. The version number 13 was skipped because of the fear of the number 13. It was previously thought that Office 2010 (then called Office 14) would ship in the first half of 2009.

On April 15, 2009, Microsoft confirmed that Office 2010 would be released in the first half of 2010. They announced on May 12, 2009, at a Tech Ed event, a trial version of the 64-bit edition. The Technical Preview 1 (Version: 14.0.4006.1010) was leaked on May 15, 2009.

An internal post-beta build was leaked on July 12, 2009. This was newer than the official preview build and included a "Limestone" internal test application (note: the EULA indicates Beta 2). On July 13, 2009, Microsoft announced Office 2010 at its Worldwide Partner Conference 2009.

On July 14, 2009, Microsoft started to send out invitations on Microsoft Connect to test an official preview build of Office 2010. On August 30, 2009, the beta build 4417 was leaked on the internet via torrents.

The public beta was available to subscribers of TechNet, MSDN and Microsoft Connect users on November 16, 2009. On November 18, 2009, the beta was officially released to the general public at the Microsoft Office Beta website, which was originally launched by Microsoft on November 11, 2009 to provide screenshots of the new office suite. Office 2010 Beta was a free, fully functional version and expired on October 31, 2010.

In an effort to help customers and partners with deployment of Office 2010, Microsoft launched an Office 2010 application compatibility program with tools and guidance available for download. On February 5, 2010, the official release candidate build 4734.1000 was available to Connect and MSDN testers. It was leaked to torrent sites. A few days after, the RTM Escrow build was leaked.

Microsoft announced the RTM on April 15, 2010, and that the final version was to have speech technologies for use with text to speech in Microsoft OneNote, Microsoft PowerPoint, Microsoft Outlook, and Microsoft Word. Office 2010 was to be originally released to business customers on May 12, 2010, however it was made available to Business customers with Software Assurance on April 27, 2010, and to other Volume Licensing Customers on May 1. MSDN and TechNet subscribers have been able to download the RTM version since April 22, 2010. The RTM version number is 14.0.4763.1000. Office 2010 was launched for general customer availability on June 15, 2010.

=== Service packs ===
Service pack	Version number	Release date
Service Pack 1 (SP1)	14.0.6029.1000	November 17, 2010
Service Pack 2 (SP2)	14.0.7015.1000	April 8, 2013

Microsoft released two service packs for Office 2010 that were primarily intended to address software bugs. Service Pack 1 (SP1) and Service Pack 2 (SP2) were released concurrently with updates for additional products including Office Online, SharePoint, and SharePoint Designer.

On November 17, 2010, Microsoft invited a select number of testers at the Microsoft Connect Web portal to test SP1 Beta 1. SP1 was released by Microsoft on June 27, 2011, and included compatibility, performance, security, and stability improvements. SP1 is a cumulative update that includes all previous updates, as well as fixes exclusive to its release; a list of exclusive fixes was released by Microsoft. SP1 also introduced additional features for Access, Excel, OneNote, Outlook, PowerPoint, and Word. As examples, OneNote 2010 SP1 introduced the ability to open notebooks stored in OneDrive directly from within the app itself, while Outlook 2010 SP1 introduced Microsoft 365 support. With the release of SP1, the use of Office Online in Google Chrome and Internet Explorer 9 was officially supported by Microsoft for the first time.

On April 8, 2013, a beta build of Office 2010 SP2 was released. SP2 was a cumulative update officially released on July 16, 2013, and included all of the previously released compatibility, performance, stability, and security fixes, as well as numerous exclusive fixes; a list of fixes exclusive to SP2 was released by Microsoft. Microsoft claimed that with the release of SP2, Office 2010 would feature improved compatibility with Internet Explorer 10, Office 2013, and SharePoint 2013. Because SP2 is cumulative, SP1 is not a prerequisite for its installation.

== New features ==
=== User interface ===
In both its client programs and in its Internet implementation, the design of Office 2010 incorporates features from SharePoint and borrows from Web 2.0 ideas. Office 2010 is more "role-based" than previous versions of Microsoft Office, with specific features tailored to employees in "roles such as research and development professionals, sales people, and human resources."

==== Backstage view ====
The Info tab in the navigation pane of Backstage displaying a document overview alongside management tasks in Word 2010.

A new Backstage view interface replaces the Office menu introduced in Office 2007 and is designed to facilitate access to document management and sharing tasks by consolidating them within a single location. In theatre, backstage refers to the area behind the stage where behind the scenes activities and preparations commence; the Backstage view is accordingly an interface dedicated to activities and preparations before saving or sharing a document. Backstage consists of both a left-hand navigation pane and an adjacent main pane; the navigation pane includes a series of vertically arranged common commands to open or save files, and tabs that, when opened, expose document management tasks and contextual information within the main pane. A customizable number of recently opened documents can also be displayed within the navigation pane.

Tasks that are accessed via tabs in the main Backstage pane are categorized into separate groups that display contextual information related to app configurations, files, and tasks; each tab displays information relevant to that specific tab. On the Info tab in Word, for example, document metadata details are displayed within the Prepare for Sharing group to inform users of potentially personal information before the file is shared with other users, whereas the Help tab displays Office 2010 version information and product licensing status. In Office 2007, this information was included within separate locations. From the Info tab, users can access revisions of currently open Excel, PowerPoint, and Word documents, as well as the latest unsaved version of a document that was previously closed. Within the Print tab, Backstage also combines the previously separate print and print preview features by displaying printer tasks, settings, and a zooming user interface to preview the currently open document without the user having to open a dialog box.

Backstage is extensible; developers can add their own commands, tabs, tasks, or related information.

==== File tab ====
The File tab replaces the Office button introduced in Office 2007 and offers similar functionality. The previous Office button—a round button adorned with the Microsoft Office 2007 logo—had a different appearance from the ribbon tabs in the Office 2007 interface and was positioned away from them, with a target that extended toward the upper left corner of the screen in accordance with Fitts's law. Microsoft stated this button enhanced the usability of Office, but many users saw it as "branding decoration, rather than a functional button." As a result, in Office 2010 it was replaced with a File tab that appears next to the other tabs in the ribbon instead of the upper left-hand corner of the screen. The File tab is colored on a per-app basis (e.g., it is colored orange in Outlook). Opening the File tab displays the new Backstage view.

==== Pasting options gallery ====
Office 2010 introduces a pasting options gallery on the ribbon, in the context menu, and in the object-oriented user interface that replaces the Paste Special dialog box and Paste Recovery feature seen in previous versions of Office. The gallery introduces Live Preview effects to the paste process when users position the mouse cursor over an option in the gallery so that the result of the process can be previewed before it is applied to the document; a tooltip with an associated description and keyboard shortcut for that option will also appear. If users position the mouse cursor over a gallery option in the context menu, the rest of the context menu becomes transparent so that it does not obstruct preview results within the document. To facilitate keyboard-based paste operations, users can navigate the gallery by using the arrow keys on a keyboard or press Ctrl after pressing Ctrl+V to display gallery options. Gallery options change based on the content in the clipboard and the app into which the content is pasted.

==== Ribbon improvements ====
The ribbon introduced in Office 2007 is fully customizable and included in all programs in Office 2010. Users can add or rename custom ribbon tabs or groups, add additional commands to the default tabs, and hide tabs that are not used. Users can also export or import any customization changes made to the ribbon to facilitate backups, deployment, or sharing, or reset all ribbon customizations. The ribbon was also updated with a visible interface option to minimize it, which leaves only the tabs exposed.

After the launch of Office 2010, Microsoft provided free downloads for a new Favorites tab that consolidated commands based on customer feedback regarding the most frequently used commands in all Office programs.

==== Other UI changes ====
- The default color scheme in Office 2010 is silver instead of blue as in Office 2007 and now features a 5:1 contrast ratio to improve accessibility and readability.
- All app icons have been redesigned in Office 2010. The new icons are based on colors that correspond to their respective programs, as per previous releases, with an increased emphasis on app letters.
- The Office 2010 splash screen has been redesigned from the one seen in Office 2007 and animates when an app is launched.
- OneNote and PowerPoint support mathematical equations through an Equation Tools contextual tab on the ribbon.
- PowerPoint and Publisher include alignment guides so users can align objects to a grid.
- Smart tags introduced in Office XP have been renamed as Actions and are now accessible from the context menu.

=== File formats ===
Office 2010 includes updated support for ISO/IEC 29500, the International Standard version of Office Open XML (OOXML) file format. Office 2010 provides read support for ECMA-376, read/write support for ISO/IEC 29500 Transitional, and read support for ISO/IEC 29500 Strict. In its pre-release form, however, Office 2010 only supported the Transitional variant, and not the Strict.

Office 2010 also continued support for OpenDocument Format (ODF) 1.1, which is a joint OASIS/ISO/IEC standard (ISO/IEC 26300:2006/Amd 1:2012 — Open Document Format for Office Applications (OpenDocument) v1.1).

=== Document co-authoring ===
Office 2010 introduces co-authoring functionality in the Excel Web App, the OneNote Web App, and in the client versions of OneNote, PowerPoint, and Word for documents stored on SharePoint 2010 sites and for shared documents in OneDrive and Microsoft 365. A co-authoring session is automatically initiated when two or more users open the same document. From Backstage within Excel, OneNote, PowerPoint, and Word, users can also save documents directly to remote locations to facilitate remote access and co-authoring sessions. In the Excel Web App, the OneNote, and the OneNote Web App edits to a shared document in a co-authoring session occur on a sequential basis, in near real-time, as shared documents save automatically with each edit. In PowerPoint and Word, however, users must upload changes to the server by manually saving the shared document.

During a co-authoring session the Excel Web App, PowerPoint, and Word denote how many co-authors are editing a document through a status bar icon that, when clicked in PowerPoint and Word, displays contact information including the presence of co-authors; the Info tab of Backstage also displays these details. When users open the name of a co-author, they can send email with an email client or start instant messaging conversations with each other if a supported app such as Skype for Business is installed on each machine. If a conflict between multiple changes occurs in PowerPoint or Word, sharers can approve or reject changes before uploading them to the server.

In both OneNote and the OneNote Web App, users can view the names of co-authors alongside their respective edits to the content in a shared notebook, or create separate versions of pages for individual use. Edits made since a notebook was last opened are automatically highlighted, with initials of the co-author who made the edit displayed. In OneNote, co-authors can also search for all edits made by a specific co-author. OneNote 2010 notebooks can be shared with Office Mobile 2010 users on Windows Phone 7. OneNote 2007 users can also participate in a co-authoring session with OneNote 2010 users if shared notebooks use the older OneNote 2007 file format; however, co-author search, and page versioning, and compatibility with the OneNote Web App will not be available.

=== Installation and deployment ===
Office 2010 introduces a new Click-to-Run installation process based on Microsoft App-V Version 4 streaming and virtualization technology as an alternative to the traditional Windows Installer-based installation process for the Home and Student and Home and Business editions, and as a mandatory installation process for the Starter edition. Click-to-Run products install in a virtualized environment (a Q: partition) that downloads product features in the background after the programs have been installed so that users can immediately begin using the programs. The download process is optimized for broadband connections. Only three editions of Office 2010 were released with Click-To-Run — Home and Business 2010, Starter 2010 and Home and Student 2010. The rest of the Office 2010 editions used Windows Installer.

During the Office 2010 retail lifecycle Microsoft, in collaboration with original equipment manufacturers (OEMs) and retail partners, introduced a Product Key Card licensing program that allowed users to purchase a single license to activate Home and Student, Home and Business, and Professional editions preinstalled on personal computers at a reduced cost when compared with traditional retail media. Product Key Card versions are restricted to a single machine.

Volume license versions of Office 2010 also require product activation. Office 2007's product activation was only required for OEM or retail versions of the product.

=== Security ===
==== Office File Validation ====
Office File Validation, previously included only in Publisher 2007 for PUB files has been incorporated into Excel, PowerPoint, and Word in Office 2010 to validate the integrity of proprietary binary file formats (e.g., DOC, PPT, and XLS) introduced in previous versions of Microsoft Office. When users open a document, the structure of its file format is scanned to ensure that it conforms with specifications defined by XML schema; if a file fails the validation process it will, by default, be opened in Protected View, a new read-only, isolated sandbox environment to protect users from potentially malicious content. this design allows users to visually assess potentially unsafe documents that fail validation. Microsoft stated that it is possible for documents to fail validation as a false positive. To improve Office File Validation, Office 2010 collects various information about files that have failed validation and also creates copies of these files for optional submission to Microsoft through Windows Error Reporting. Users are prompted approximately every two weeks from the date of a failed validation attempt to submit copies of files or of other information for analysis; prompts include a list of files that will be submitted to Microsoft and require explicit user consent prior to submission. Administrators can disable data submission.

On December 14, 2010, Microsoft announced it would backport Office File Validation to Office 2003 and Office 2007. On April 12, 2011, it was backported as an add-in for Office 2003 SP3 and Office 2007 SP2, and on June 28, 2011, was made available through Microsoft Update. Office File Validation in Office 2003 and Office 2007 differs from the version in Office 2010 as these two releases do not include the Protected View feature. When users attempt to open a document that fails validation, they must first agree to a warning prompt before it can be opened. Additionally, the configuration options in these two releases are only made available through the Windows Registry, whereas Office 2010 also provides Group Policy options.

==== Protected View ====
Protected View, an isolated sandbox environment for Excel, PowerPoint, and Word, replaces the Isolated Conversion Environment update available for previous versions of Microsoft Office. When a document is opened from a potentially unsafe location such as the Internet or as an e-mail attachment, or if a document does not comply with File Block policy or if it fails Office File Validation, it is opened in Protected View, which prohibits potentially unsafe documents from modifying components, files, and other resources on a system; users can also manually open documents in Protected View. When a document is opened in Protected View, users are allowed to view, copy, and paste the contents of the document, but there are no options to edit, save, or print contents, and all active document content including ActiveX controls, database connections, hyperlinks, and macros is disabled. Users can open documents outside of Protected View by clicking on the "Enable Editing" button that appears on a message bar within the Office user interface. As a precautionary measure, active content within a potentially unsafe document remains disabled when a user reopens it after exiting Protected View until a user clicks the "Enable Content" button on the message bar, which designates the document as a trusted document so that users are not prompted when it is opened in the future.

Protected View is implemented as a separate child process instance of Excel, PowerPoint, and Word. The main process of each app is assigned the current user's access token and hosts the Office user interface elements such as the ribbon, whereas the Protected View process consists of the document viewing area, parses and renders the document content, and operates with reduced privileges; the main process serves as a mediator for requests initiated by the separate process. In later versions of Windows, Mandatory Integrity Control and User Interface Privilege Isolation further restrict the separate process. Protected View is also available when Office 2010 is installed, but it is not as robust due to the absence of these security features. Protected View is also available when Office 2010 is installed on Windows XP, but it is not as robust due to the absence of these security features.

==== Trusted documents ====
Office 2010 allows users to designate individual documents as trusted, which allows all active content to operate each time a specific document is opened; trusted documents do not open in Protected View. Documents residing in either local or remote directories can be trusted, but users are warned if an attempt is made to trust a document from a remote resource. To increase security, documents in Temporary Internet Files and the TEMP directory cannot be trusted. Trusted document preferences, referred to as trust records, are stored within the Windows Registry on a per-user basis; trust records contain the full path to trusted documents and other specific file information to protect users from social engineering attacks.

==== Other security features ====
- Office 2010 is the first version of Office to natively support Data Execution Prevention (DEP). It complies with DEP policies and provides options to disable DEP in the interface or through Group Policy.
- An Office ActiveX kill bit provides options to configure ActiveX controls within Office 2010 without affecting the operation of these controls within Internet Explorer.
- Additional Group Policy settings for File Block functionality in Excel, PowerPoint, and Word.
- Cryptography improvements including support for Cryptography API: Next Generation in Access, Excel, InfoPath, OneNote, PowerPoint, and Word; Suite B support; and integrity validation of encrypted files.
- Document time stamping of digital signatures.
- Domain-based password complexity and enforcement policies.

=== Graphics ===
==== Artistic effects ====
Excel, Outlook, PowerPoint, and Word include a variety of artistic effects such as glass, paint stroke, pastel, and pencil sketch effects that users can apply to inserted images.

==== Background removal ====
A new background removal feature based on Microsoft Research technology is included in Excel, Outlook, PowerPoint, and Word to remove the backgrounds of images inserted into documents. It is exposed as a Remove Background command that appears on the Picture Tools contextual tab on the ribbon when an image is selected, which displays a separate Background Removal contextual tab and places a selection rectangle and magenta color over portions of the selected image; the selection rectangle algorithmically determines which area of the selected image will be retained once the background removal process is complete, whereas the magenta color indicates the areas that will be removed. Users can manually adjust the position and size of the selection rectangle and also mark specific areas of an image to keep or remove; it is also possible to delete a mark after an inadvertent selection or if it produces an undesired result. After the background has been removed, users can apply various visual effects to the result image or wrap text in a document around it; users can also crop the image since removing the background does not reduce its original size.

==== Cropping improvements ====
Office 2010 introduces photo crop process improvements in Excel, Outlook, PowerPoint, Publisher, and Word. The crop selection rectangle now grays out the portion of a photo to be removed when cropping and displays the result area in color—instead of omitting the removed portion from view, as previous versions of Office did. Photos can now be repositioned underneath the selection rectangle. A new Aspect Ratio option under the Crop command of the ribbon presents a drop-drop down menu with options for both landscape and portrait page orientations to customize the aspect ratio of the selection rectangle before cropping, which automatically resizes the selection rectangle when users start the crop process; users can manually resize the selection rectangle and simultaneously preserve its aspect ratio by resizing it from its corners while pressing the ⇧ Shift key.

The Picture Shape command in previous versions of Office has been replaced with a new Crop to Shape command that allows users to resize and move the selected shape itself when cropping. Office 2010, like previous versions, automatically resizes photos that are inserted into shapes by default, which can negatively affect their aspect ratio. To address this, photos in shapes can now be cropped or resized after being inserted, and individual Fit and Fill options have been incorporated. The former option resizes the selected photo so that the entire area of the crop selection rectangle or shape is filled, whereas the latter option resizes the photo so that it is displayed within the selection rectangle or within a shape in its entirety; both options maintain the original aspect ratio of the selected photo. Photos inserted into SmartArt diagrams can also be cropped, resized, or repositioned.

==== Font effects and enhancements ====
Excel, PowerPoint, and Word support text effects such as bevels, gradient fills, glows, reflections, and shadows. Publisher and Word support OpenType features such as kerning, ligatures, stylistic sets, and text figures with fonts such as Calibri, Cambria, Corbel, and Gabriola.

==== Hardware acceleration ====
Excel, PowerPoint, and Word support hardware accelerated graphics when installed on a machine with a DirectX 9.0c-compliant GPU that has at least 64 MB of video memory. Excel supports hardware accelerated chart drawing, and PowerPoint supports hardware accelerated animations, transitions, and video playback and effects; slideshow elements are now rendered as sprites, which are then composited with additional effects such as fades and wipes implemented using Pixel Shader 2.0. All Office 2010 programs support Direct3D hardware accelerated SmartArt and WordArt object and text rendering. Additionally, the background removal feature and image adjustments such as brightness and contrast are all accelerated when used on capable hardware.

==== Screenshot capture ====
Excel, Outlook, PowerPoint, and Word allow users to immediately insert a screenshot of open app windows or a selection of content on the screen into documents without saving the image as a file. The functionality is exposed through a new Screenshot command on the Insert tab of the ribbon that, when clicked, presents individual options to capture either app windows or selections of content. The former option presents open windows as thumbnails in a gallery on the ribbon that insert a screenshot of the selected window into the active app, while the latter option minimizes the currently active app, dims the screen, and presents a selection rectangle for users to create a screenshot by holding the main mouse button, dragging the selection rectangle to a desired area of the screen, and then releasing the button to automatically insert the selection as an image into the document. Only windows that have not been minimized to the taskbar can be captured. After a screenshot has been inserted, various adjustments can be made.

==== SmartArt improvements ====
SmartArt, a set of diagrams introduced in Office 2007 for Excel, Outlook, PowerPoint, and Word has been updated with new effects, options, and interface improvements. The SmartArt text pane now allows users to insert, modify, and reorder images and their associated text within a diagram, and new Move Up and Move Down commands on the ribbon facilitate the reordering of content. Images are automatically cropped when inserted into shapes within SmartArt diagrams to preserve their aspect ratio; users can also manually reposition images. During the crop process, the layout of shapes in SmartArt diagrams is locked to prevent users from inadvertently modifying its position while making adjustments to an image. Approximately 50 new diagrams have been introduced. Of these, a new Picture category dedicated to the presentation of images includes over 30 diagrams, and the Organization Chart category includes 3 new diagrams.

A new Convert command on the SmartArt contextual tab of the ribbon includes additional features for Excel and PowerPoint. The Convert to Shapes feature, introduced in Office 2007 SP2 as a context menu option that turned SmartArt into a group of customizable shapes is now on the ribbon in both programs. Additionally, in PowerPoint, it is possible to convert SmartArt diagrams into bulleted lists through a new Convert to Text option.

=== Accessibility ===
==== Accessibility Checker ====
Office 2010 introduces Accessibility Checker in Excel, PowerPoint, and Word that examines documents for issues affecting visually impaired readers. It is accessible through the "Check for Issues" button on the Prepare for Sharing group on the Info tab of Backstage, which opens a task pane with a list of accessibility issues discovered in the document and provides suggestions to resolve them. Backstage itself also reports accessibility issues in the Prepare for Sharing group so that they can be resolved before the document is shared with other users. Administrators can configure how prominently this information is displayed within the interface through Group Policy.

==== Language preferences ====
A Language Preferences interface in Access, Excel, OneNote, Outlook, PowerPoint, Project, Publisher, Visio, and Word is accessible in the Backstage view and replaces the language customization interface seen in previous versions of Office. The new interface provides information about currently installed language packs and their related components, hyperlinks to download additional content, and a new ScreenTip Language feature that allows users to customize the language of tooltips.

==== Text-to-speech improvements ====
A Mini Translator allows users to translate selected text in OneNote, Outlook, PowerPoint, and Word. Translations for phrases or words are displayed within a tooltip, from which users can hear an audio pronunciation of the selected text provided by one of the Microsoft text-to-speech voices installed on a machine, copy the translation to the clipboard so that it can be inserted into another document, or view a definition provided by an online service if the selected text is a word. Audio pronunciations are made available through a Speak command, which can be accessed separately from the Mini Translator (e.g., added to the ribbon), but the command can only be used if a text-to-speech engine matching the language of the selected text is installed. Users can download various text-to-speech engines from Microsoft. The Speak command is not available when Office 2010 is installed on Windows XP.

== New app-specific features ==
New features in Word 2010

- A new navigation pane replaces the document map in previous versions of Word and allows users to drag and drop headings within the pane to rearrange pages in a document. The navigation pane also replaces the Find dialog box in previous versions and now highlights search results.
- Windows Live Writer integration

New features in Excel 2010

- Excel 2010 includes a redesigned calculation engine to improve performance in response to feedback from users related to previous versions of Excel. As part of the new calculation engine, a new version of the Solver add-in and new versions of statistical functions were introduced.
- Data points in a data series are limited only by available memory; in Excel 2007, there was a limitation of 32,000 data points.
- Graphing features including Sparklines, miniature graphics that represent trends among data; and Slicers, which allow users to quickly filter data results
- Macro recording support for chart elements
- Rule-based cell formatting

New features in PowerPoint 2010

- A new Reading View allows users to display and progress through presentations in a window.
- An Animation Painter allows users to select and copy an animation and apply it to another slide.
- Audio editing and playback functionality allows users to fade, bookmark, or trim audio.
- Presentation sections allow users to visually customize the organization of slides in a presentation.
- Support for custom shapes
- The ability to remotely broadcast a slide show ("Broadcast Slide Show") with the use of a Microsoft account; local broadcasts through SharePoint are supported.
- Users can simulate a laser pointer in PowerPoint 2010 with a mouse cursor by holding down the Ctrl key and pressing the primary mouse button during a presentation.
- Video editing and playback functionality; local videos are now embedded within slides by default so that they can be played regardless of whether users have access to their original source. Options include the ability to add various visual effects, to bookmark specific scenes for playback when advancing slides, to fade in or out, and to trim videos. Online videos can also be inserted into presentations, and presentations themselves can be saved as videos.

New features in OneNote 2010

- A native x64 printer driver for x64 operating systems
- A new docked mode enables OneNote to be displayed alongside next to another app window while taking notes.
- A notebook recycle bin, which stores for 60 days any notebooks, pages, sections, and section groups that were previously deleted.
- A Quick Filing feature allows users to choose which location in a notebook to quickly send information to from within other programs.
- Future incremental search results are prioritized based on previous search queries.
- Linked Notes reference specific sections of a source document or Web page so that clicking a note that was taken while the source was open will automatically return users to that content; Internet Explorer 6 and later versions, PowerPoint 2010, and Word 2010 support Linked Notes.
- Multi-touch pan and pinch gestures when installed on a multi-touch capable operating system
- Outlook tasks can be created directly from OneNote.
- Page versioning, which allows multiple versions of a single page to exist in a notebook
- Sections can be copied or merged.
- Style galleries, similar to those in Word, have been included in OneNote to provide basic formatting options.
- Support for automatic text wrapping.
- XPS documents protected by information rights management can be inserted as printouts.
- The ability to sync notebooks with a Microsoft account is available; SP1 introduced the ability to open notebooks from OneDrive.
- The Format Painter of Word is available in OneNote.
- Wiki-style bracket syntax can be used to link to pages, sections, and section groups from other locations in a notebook.

New features in Outlook 2010

- Calendar Groups aggregate calendars of multiple contacts to see the calendar of each content in that group; resources such as conference rooms can be added to see all calendars belonging to the contacts assigned to conference room in a building.
- Conversation View now groups messages by their corresponding subjects regardless of originating folders and includes new commands:
  - Clean Up deletes all messages in a conversation but the most recent message
  - Ignore deletes all messages in a conversation and sends all future replies to the Deleted Items folder
- Meeting Suggestions now appear when creating a meeting request; attendee schedules are analyzed to determine the most appropriate suggested time for each attendee.
- Outlook Social Connector can aggregate content from social network accounts belonging to contacts; it also displays activity feeds, attachments, appointments, and communications for contacts regardless of whether a social network is in use.
- Quick Steps are collections of commands that perform multiple actions simultaneously; users can create their own Quick Steps and optionally assign keyboard shortcuts or customize tooltips for each of them.
- Quick View displays the calendar in a message when the user receives a meeting request from a contact so that the user can review adjacent or conflicting appointments
- Search Tools contextual tab on the Ribbon appears when users perform a search so that it can be filtered based on specific criteria
- Schedule View arranges meetings in a horizontal view so users can compare contact meeting times
- Spell check is available in meeting requests, message subjects, and tasks
- Support for multiple Exchange accounts within a single Outlook profile
- The default size limit for Unicode .ost and .pst files in Outlook 2010 is 50 GB (instead of 20 GB as it was in Outlook 2007).
- The To-Do Bar introduced in Outlook 2007 includes additional customization options and visual indicators for conflicts and unanswered meeting requests.
- Unified Messaging improvements including information rights management for voice mail, and voice mail transcripts
- Users can now adjust the zoom level of calendars and messages in Outlook
- Users are now notified before sending a message without a subject
- Users are now able to change the IMAP Deleted Items folder location

New features in Publisher 2010

- A new Page Navigation pane presents thumbnails of each page in a document; clicking a thumbnail opens that page, while dragging it rearranges pages.
- Live Preview effects for formatting, objects, and text
- Options to share building blocks and templates to the online Publisher user communities.
- The scratch area can now be hidden.

New features in Access 2010

- A Navigation Form interface allows database elements to be customized via drag-and-drop.
- An Image Gallery stores previously used images so that users can quickly reuse them in a database.
- Application Parts, which are predefined database templates are available.
- Data bars now offer gradient fill options.
- Databases can be shared on the Web via Access Services in Microsoft SharePoint Server 2010.
- Quick Start fields provide predefined groups
- Web services can be used as external data sources in Access 2010.

== Removed features ==
Removed from the entire suite

- Document workspaces
- InterConnect support
- Microsoft Office Document Imaging
- Microsoft Office Document Scanning
- Office Startup Assistant
- Office Diagnostics
- Research and Reference pane for Internet Explorer
- Special symbol input add-in for East Asia versions
- Support for MSXML version 5
- Insert Clip Art task pane and various Clip Organizer features

Features removed from Word

- AutoSummary feature
- Support for Word Add-in Libraries (WLL)

Features removed from Excel

- The Conditional Sum and Lookup wizards have been deprecated; a new Function wizard offers similar functionality
- The Person Name smart tag has been removed

Features removed from PowerPoint

- The ability to save a presentation as a web page
- The option to change the maximum size of sounds inserted in presentations has been replaced by the ability to embed files of any size, which provides similar options

Features removed from OneNote

- List and Document task panes are no longer available
- Live Session functionality, including the ability to start and join a live session; Microsoft touts the new Shared Notebook functionality as a replacement
- Options to create Outlook appointments or contacts
- Outlining toolbar
- SimpleImporter API

Features removed from Outlook

- ANSI offline Outlook data files (.ost) for Exchange synchronization
- Business Contact Manager;
  - Microsoft subsequently released Business Contact Manager as a free download for Office 2010 Professional or Outlook 2010 consumers with Small Business or Professional editions of Office 2003 or Office 2007, the Ultimate edition of Office 2007, or Outlook 2003 or Outlook 2007.
- Calendar rebasing tool
- DAV connectivity for HTTP account types
- Exchange 2000 connectivity
- Exchange Message Security feature support
- Postmarks
- Photo resize options for 640x480 (VGA) and 800x600 (SVGA) display resolutions
- Search toolbar add-in

Features removed from Publisher

- The ability to create new web publications or websites; users can still edit publications or websites created in earlier versions of Publisher
- Various outdated publication settings

Features removed from Access

- Calendar control
- Data access pages
- ISAM for Lotus 1-2-3. Paradox versions 3–7, Access 1.0, and Access 2.0 (Red 2 or Jet 2.0)
- Replication Conflict Viewer
- Reports can no longer be exported as individual SNP files; Microsoft recommends that users export to PDF or XPS files

Features removed from Project

- Custom forms support
- Office Web Components resource availability graphs
- Save as Excel Pivot Table has been deprecated; the ability to save directly into a Pivot Table is no longer available
- Various add-ins have been removed

Features removed from Visio

- ShapeStudio, available in previous versions of the Visio software development kit (SDK), has been removed from the Visio 2010 SDK
- The Find Shape feature; users can instead search for new content online
- Users can no longer dock items to the top or to the bottom of the interface
- Various status bar items

== Editions ==
=== Comparison ===
Comparison of Microsoft Office 2010 editions
Suites	As an individual product	Starter	Office Online	Personal (Note: Office 2010 Personal was available only in Japan.)	Home and Student (Note: Office 2010 Home and Student can be installed on up to three machines in a single household for non-commercial use; the Product Key Card version permits one installation on a single machine.)	Home and Business (Note: Office 2010 Home and Business and Office 2010 Professional can be installed on two devices for use by a single user; the Product Key Card version permits one installation on a single machine.)	Standard	Professional Professional Academic (Note: On February 1, 2012, Office 2010 University replaced Office 2010 Professional Academic in an effort to curtail fraudulent product use.) University	Professional Plus (Note: Office 2010 Professional Plus is available to Volume License customers. It is also offered through MSDN or TechNet.)	Mondo (Note: Office 2010 Mondo is a test SKU meant for internal testing at Microsoft. It was never sold to customers, but some beta versions of this SKU have been leaked online.)
Licensing scheme	Varies	OEM	Free	Retail and OEM	Retail	Retail	Volume	Academic and Retail	Volume	Internal
Word	Yes	Starter edition	Web-based	Yes	Yes	Yes	Yes	Yes	Yes	Yes
Excel	Yes	Starter edition	Web-based	Yes	Yes	Yes	Yes	Yes	Yes	Yes
PowerPoint	Yes	Viewer (Separate)	Web-based	Viewer (Separate)	Yes	Yes	Yes	Yes	Yes	Yes
OneNote	Yes	No	Web-based	No	Yes	Yes	Yes	Yes	Yes	Yes
Outlook	Yes	No	No	Yes	No	Yes	Yes	Yes	Yes	Yes
Publisher	Yes	No	No	No	No	No	Yes	Yes	Yes	Yes
Access	Yes	No	No	No	No	No	No	Yes	Yes	Yes
InfoPath	Yes	No	No	No	No	No	No	No	Yes	Yes
SharePoint Workspace	Yes	No	No	No	No	No	No	No	Yes	Yes
SharePoint Designer	Yes	No	No	No	No	No	No	No	No	Yes
Project	Yes	No	No	No	No	No	No	No	No	Yes
Visio	Yes	Viewer (Separate)	No	Viewer	Viewer	Viewer	Viewer (Separate)	Viewer	Viewer	Yes
Lync	Yes	No	No	No	No	No	No	No	Volume channel only	No
Picture Manager	No	No	No	No	Yes	Yes	Yes	Yes	Yes	Yes
Office Customization Tool (OCT) (Note: The Office Customization Tool is used to customize the installation of Office by creating a Windows Installer Patch (.MSP) file, and replaces the Custom Installation Wizard and Custom Deployment Wizard included in Office 2003 and earlier versions of the Office Resource Kit. It is available in Volume License editions.)	No	No	No	No	No	No	Volume channel only	No	Volume channel only	Yes

Remarks

=== Starter edition ===
Office Starter 2010 is an ad-supported, reduced-functionality edition consisting of Excel and Word, discontinued in June 2012 before the release of Office 2013. Office Starter 2010 was available to original equipment manufacturers (OEMs) to preload on Windows PCs as a replacement for Microsoft Works. Word Starter 2010 cannot insert captions, citations, footnotes, endnotes, equations, indexes, or SmartArt graphics or text, and it does not support change trackage, customization, digital rights management, full screen view, or macro functionality. Excel Starter 2010 does not support calculation steps, circular references, custom views, error analyses, external data connections, PivotTables, or PivotCharts. Office Starter 2010 is the only edition to offer a To-Go Device Manager feature, which allows users to install the productivity suite to a USB flash drive and run it temporarily on any computer to which the USB drive is connected.

=== Academic editions ===
Office Professional Academic was sold at college campuses for a discounted price of $99 compared to Professional, selling at $499. It is binary-identical to Office Professional; the only difference is the licensing, only being licensed for students and faculty at colleges and universities.

On February 1st 2012, Microsoft replaced Professional Academic with Office University as a way to curtail the resale of discounted copies of Office to people not actively enrolled in a college. A product key was not included in the box; instead, a 27-digit PIN was included to redeem the product key online. Redeeming a product key required the PIN and proof of active enrollment; once redeemed, a product key for Professional Academic was given. Students and faculty were only allowed to redeem one product key per year.

=== Office Online ===
Office Online is a collection of free Web-based versions of Excel, OneNote, PowerPoint, and Word that offers fewer features than its client counterparts. It was released to OneDrive users before the general availability of Office 2010.

=== Office Mobile 2010 ===
Office Mobile 2010 was released before general availability of Office 2010 as a free upgrade for users of Windows Mobile 6.5 devices with a previous version of Office Mobile installed. New features in Office Mobile 2010 include:

- Conversation View: When used with Exchange Server 2007 or later, Outlook Mobile 2010 combines related emails into a group for easier reading and management—as the Outlook 2010 desktop client does.
- PowerPoint Streaming: When used in Windows Phone 7, Office Mobile 2010 can stream high-fidelity presentations from a PC to a phone.
- Presentation Companion: PowerPoint Mobile 2010 allows users to use Bluetooth to control a computer presentation from Windows Mobile and view speaker notes on the mobile screen.
- SharePoint Workspace Mobile 2010: Users can email or sync documents from SharePoint Server 2010 directly to their Windows Mobile devices for offline viewing and editing and sync them when reconnected.
- SmartArt Graphics: Office Mobile 2010 can display SmartArt charts and graphics. PowerPoint Mobile 2010 in particular has enhanced support for displaying SmartArt graphics.
- Text Reflow: Preserves charts, rich formatting options, SmartArt graphics, and tables in Office 2010 documents when transferred from a computer and saved in Windows Mobile.
- Touch Optimizations: There are optimizations for touch-based interaction including flick gestures and larger buttons.

=== System requirements ===
Office 2010 system requirements
Requirement	Minimum	Recommended
Microsoft Windows
Operating system	Windows XP SP3, Windows Server 2003 SP2 or later	
CPU	500 MHz (1 GHz for Outlook with Business Contact Manager)	
Memory	256 MB (1 GB for Outlook with Business Contact Manager)	512 MB
Free space	3 GB of free space (3.5 GB for Professional, Professional Academic, Professional Plus)	
Graphics hardware	1024×768 (XGA) (1024x576 (WSVGA) for Home and Student, Home and Business)	DirectX 9.0c graphics processor and 64 MB video memory
Network	Internet access is required for product activation and online functionality	
Input device(s)	Mouse and keyboard	Camcorder, scanner, or TWAIN-compatible digital camera for certain OneNote features Microphone for speech recognition Touchscreen for certain inking features

== Reception ==
=== Critical reception ===
Office 2010 received mostly positive reviews upon its release, with particular praise devoted to the modified ribbon and the new Backstage view. Laptop Mag rated the suite 4 out of 5 stars, referring to it as “the best Office suite yet” because of the new customization options provided by the ribbon, the new multimedia editing capabilities, a new option to share presentations online via PowerPoint, and app response times; Microsoft's decision to include OneNote in all retail versions of Office 2010 also received high praise. PC Magazine also rated the suite 4 out of 5 stars for similar reasons; the inclusion of the ribbon in all programs was viewed favorably because it enhances consistency and usability, and the Backstage view was praised for simplifying access to file management and printing options. However, PC Magazine expressed dissatisfaction with the "intrusive" default auto formatting options in Word; the lack of an upgrade edition or pricing for users of a previous version of Office; and the stability of Office programs. Nevertheless, Office 2010 was regarded as a "dazzlingly attractive upgrade” that received the magazine's Editors' Choice and Best of the Year 2010 accolades. Office 2010 also received positive reviews from Alphr, PC Advisor, PC World, and TechRadar.

Not all assessments and reviews were positive. InfoWorld considered the modified Ribbon in Office 2010 to be a "disorganized mess", and the user-interface conventions to be confusing because of the lack of consistency across routine functions. The Backstage view was also criticized for "containing a schizophrenic array of buttons, button menus, and hyperlink-like text labels" and for being presented as a full-screen interface instead of as a drop-down menu similar to Paint and WordPad. Sluggish performance was also a subject of criticism, although the review was written before development of the product had been formally completed.

Reactions to the various product versions, including the 64-bit version of Office 2010, were mixed. Ars Technica believed that Microsoft's transition to a 64-bit version of Office would facilitate the industry's adoption of 64-bit software. However, concerns about backward compatibility and performance issues were raised. After the product's launch, Microsoft stated that "the 64-bit version of Office 2010 is likely to introduce compatibility issues" and recommended the 32-bit version for most users; the Office 2010 setup program installs the 32-bit version by default unless a 64-bit version is already installed on the target machine. In a departure from previous versions of Office, Microsoft did not offer an upgrade version of Office 2010—a move that was criticized for effectively increasing the cost of the product for users already running a previous version. While the new Product Key Card program was considered to be an affordable alternative to an upgrade version because of its affordability when compared with a full retail purchase, it presented a limitation not seen with a full retail version in that its license prohibited the software from being transferred to another machine.

The Starter edition of Office 2010 received mostly positive reviews; a feature omitted from other editions of Office 2010 that received praise was To-Go Device Manager, which allowed users to copy Office 2010 Starter installation files to a USB flash drive and use its programs on another PC, even one where a version of Office was not installed. However, criticism was directed at the edition's lack of functionality and its mandatory advertisements.

=== Sales ===
The initial two-week sales of Office 2010 were lower than those previously observed with the suite's predecessor, Office 2007, a fact considered by Stephen Baker of NPD Group to be “disappointing.” Baker attributed this lack of sales to "a seasonally slow period for PC purchases" and an "increasingly saturated installed base." Free alternatives to the productivity suite such as Google Docs were not regarded as detrimental to the adoption of Office 2010; however, this view was not shared by all journalists. In spite of initial sales that were lower than expected, sales of Office 2010—particularly consumer sales—contributed to a record first-quarter profit for Microsoft during its 2011 fiscal year. While other products contributed to this record, Microsoft Business Division, the division responsible for Office, earned the highest percentage of total revenue during this time period. As of November 1, 2010, over six million copies of Office 2010 were sold, a figure that represented "more than 30 copies being sold every minute."

Details related to Microsoft's second-quarter earnings during the company's 2011 fiscal year were posted on January 27, 2011, showing that the company had set a record for second-quarter revenue of $19.95 billion. The Microsoft Business Division grew by 24% year-over-year, with Office 2010 becoming the fastest-selling consumer version of Office in history; license sales of Office 2010 were also "over 50% ahead of Office 2007 over an equivalent period following launch." Results during the company's third-quarter 2011 fiscal year were later strong, with Microsoft's Business division expecting to see "Office sales exceed PC demand in fiscal 2011.”

On June 15, 2011, a year after Office 2010's general availability, Microsoft Office corporate vice president Takeshi Numoto stated that deployment of the productivity suite among business customers was “five times faster” than that of its predecessor, Office 2007, and that the latest version was “the fastest-selling consumer version of Office ever” with a copy being sold every second since the product launched; the claim was previously made by Microsoft in January during the Consumer Electronics Show. Based on this claim, Network World estimated that an approximate 31.5 million licenses were sold since Office 2010's launch. Office Online proved to be popular as well, with Numoto stating that it had seen over 50 million unique visitors since its launch. By July 2011, over 100 million licenses were sold, which contributed to record Q4 earnings and annual revenue. However, year-over-year consumer revenue for Office had declined by 8 percent, though revenue from Microsoft's Business Division had increased by 27 percent during the same period. During the second quarter of Microsoft's 2012 fiscal year, the company reported a revenue of $20.9 billion—another record for the company—with Office 2010 being a contributing factor, having sold nearly 200 million licenses as of December 31, 2011, in spite of declining Windows sales.

Microsoft reportedly discontinued sales of Office 2010 on January 31, 2013, just two days after its successor, Office 2013, reached general availability.

=== Enterprise adoption ===
According to a survey conducted by market research company Forrester Research in 2011 with a sample consisting of 150 North American and European enterprise executives, Office 2010 was in use by 52% of respondents, behind Office 2003 or earlier and Office 2007 at 74% and 72%, respectively. In a 2013 survey, Office 2010 was the dominant productivity suite when compared to previous versions and competitors' offerings with a total of 85% usage share among the 155 enterprise survey respondents. According to a 2017 survey, Office 2010 was the most used edition of Microsoft Office among organizations with a usage share of 83% — surpassing Office 2007 at 68% and Office 2003 at 46%, respectively. About 53% of respondents were also using Microsoft 365 (then Office 365).

== See also ==
- Microsoft Office for Mac 2011
- Comparison of office suites
- List of office suites
