= Microsoft Office XP =

Version of Microsoft Office suite

- Microsoft Office XP applications from top-right: Word, Excel, Outlook, and PowerPoint which collectively make up the Standard edition.
- Developer: Microsoft
- Release: May 31, 2001; 25 years ago
- Final release: Service Pack 3 (10.0.6501.6626) / March 30, 2004; 22 years ago
- Operating system: Windows NT 4.0 SP6 or later
- Platform: IA-32
- Predecessor: Microsoft Office 2000 (1999)
- Successor: Microsoft Office 2003 (2003)
- Available in: 35 languages
- List of languages Arabic, Bulgarian, Chinese (Hong Kong SAR), Chinese Simplified, Chinese Traditional, Croatian, Czech, Danish, Dutch, English, Estonian, Finnish, French, German, Greek, Hebrew, Hungarian, Icelandic, Italian, Japanese, Korean, Latvian, Lithuanian, Norwegian, Polish, Portuguese (Brazil), Portuguese (Portugal), Romanian, Russian, Slovak, Slovenian, Spanish, Swedish, Thai, Turkish
- Type: Office suite
- License: Proprietary commercial software
- Website: Microsoft Office XP (Archived at Wayback Machine)

Microsoft Office XP (codenamed Office 10) is an office suite which was officially revealed in July 2000 by Microsoft for the Windows operating system. Office XP development was completed on March 2, 2001, a date the development team committed to hitting from the start of the project, with a press release dated March 5, 2001 announcing its release to manufacturing. It was later made available to retail on May 31, 2001. A Mac OS X equivalent, Microsoft Office v. X was released on November 19, 2001.

New features in Office XP include smart tags, a selection-based search feature that recognizes different types of text in a document so that users can perform additional actions; a task pane interface that consolidates popular menu bar commands on the right side of the screen to facilitate quick access to them; new document collaboration capabilities, support for MSN Groups and SharePoint; and integrated handwriting recognition and speech recognition capabilities. With Office XP, Microsoft incorporated several features to address reliability issues observed in previous versions of Office. Office XP also introduces separate Document Imaging, Document Scanning, and Clip Organizer applications. The Office Assistant (commonly known as "Clippy"), which was introduced in Office 97 and widely reviled by users, is disabled by default in Office XP; this change was a key element of Microsoft's promotional campaign for Office XP.

Office XP is compatible with Windows NT 4.0 SP6 through Windows Vista and Windows Server 2008. It is the last version of Microsoft Office to run on Windows NT 4.0 SP6+, Windows 98, Windows 2000 RTM through SP2, and Windows Me.

Office XP received mostly positive reviews upon its release, with critics praising its collaboration features, document protection and recovery functionality, and smart tags; however, the suite's handwriting recognition and speech recognition capabilities were criticized and were mostly viewed as inferior to similar offerings from competitors. As of May 2002, over 60 million Office XP licenses had been sold.

Microsoft released three service packs for Office XP during its lifetime. Support for Office XP ended on July 12, 2011.

== History ==
At a meeting with financial analysts in July 2000, Microsoft demonstrated Office XP, then known by its codename, Office 10, which included a subset of features Microsoft designed in accordance with what at the time was known as the Microsoft .NET strategy, one by which it intended to provide extensive client access to various web services and features such as speech recognition. SharePoint Portal Server 2001, then codenamed Tahoe, was also in development at this time and was slated to improve collaboration for users of Office 2000 and Office 10. In August, Microsoft released Office 10 Beta 1 for product evaluation purposes. During this period Office 10 was characterized as an interim release between its predecessor, Office 2000 and a future version, and was planned to include new formatting options; integrated speech recognition; improved collaboration capabilities and enhanced support for web services; and a web portal complete with web parts. Office XP Beta 1 was compatible with Windows 95, Windows 98, Windows NT 4.0 SP5, and Windows 2000.

Before the release of Office 10 Beta 2, there was speculation that Microsoft intended to rebrand the new product as "Office 2001," "Office 2002," "Office.NET," or "Office XP." The latter was shorthand for eXPerience and was positioned as a brand that would emphasize the new experiences enabled by the product. At the time, Microsoft intended to name the latest version of Visual Studio as "Visual Studio .NET" but unnamed sources stated that the company did not desire to do the same with Office 10, as the product was only partially related to the company's .NET strategy. Microsoft ultimately decided on "Office XP" as the final name of the product. In spite of this, individual Office XP products such as Excel, PowerPoint, and Word would continue to use Microsoft's year-based naming conventions and were named after the year 2002.

Office XP Beta 2 was released to 10,000 technical testers in late 2000. Beta 2 introduced several improvements to setup tools. The Custom Maintenance Wizard, for example, now allowed setup components to be modified after their installation, and the setup process of Office XP itself used a new version of Windows Installer. Microsoft also terminated the product's support for Windows 95 and Windows NT 4.0 SP5. After the release of Beta 2, Microsoft announced a Corporate Preview Kit Program for Office XP that would allow up to 500,000 corporate customers to evaluate a Corporate Preview Beta version of the product on a total of 10 machines per copy; individual copies cost $19.95 and expired on August 31, 2001.

Office XP was finished on March 2, 2001, a date the team chose at the start of the project for its "3...2...1" appeal and made extraordinary efforts to hit without any slip. A press release on March 5, 2001 announced its release to manufacturing. Office XP was later made available to retail on May 31, 2001.

=== Service packs ===
Service pack	Release date
Service Pack 1 (SP1)	December 11, 2001
Service Pack 2 (SP2)	August 21, 2002
Service Pack 3 (SP3)	March 30, 2004

Microsoft released three service packs for Office XP throughout the product's lifecycle that introduce security enhancements, stability improvements, and software bug fixes; each service pack could be installed as a separate Client or Full File update version: Client updates are for Office XP CD-ROM installations, were obtainable from Microsoft Office Update or as standalone downloads, and require Office XP installation media—these updates cannot be uninstalled. Full File updates do not require access to installation media and are intended for network administrators to deploy updates to Office XP users who installed the product from a server location; users could also manually install Full File updates. Full File updates require Windows Installer 2.0; Office XP shipped with version 1.1. Windows Installer 2.0 shipped with Windows XP. On September 25, 2001, Microsoft released Windows Installer 2.0 redistributables for Windows 9x, Windows NT 4.0 and Windows 2000.

Service Pack 1 (SP1) included performance and security improvements, as well as stability improvements based on error reports from users. SP1 also resolved an issue that prevented documents from being saved to MSN Groups.

Service Pack 2 (SP2) included all previously available standalone updates; some of those previously released included cumulative security patches for Excel 2002 and Word 2002 to address potentially malicious code embedded in document macros. The Full File version of SP2 is cumulative—SP1 does not have to be installed—while the Client version requires SP1 to be installed. Only Full File updates released after SP2 can be applied directly to Client installations of Office XP. Earlier updates were designed to update only administrative images and fail when applied directly to clients.

Service Pack 3 (SP3) included all previously released updates, as well as previously unreleased stability improvements based on feedback and error reports received from users. SP3 does not require any earlier service packs to be installed. However, if an Office XP client was updated from a patched administrative image, the Full File version of SP3 must be installed.

== New features ==
=== User interface ===
Office XP has a streamlined, flatter appearance compared to previous versions of Office. According to Microsoft, this change involved "removing visually competing elements, visually prioritizing items on a page, increasing letter spacing and word spacing for better readability, and defining foreground and background color to bring the most important elements to the front."

==== Smart tags ====
Excel 2002 and Word 2002 introduce smart tags, commands for specific types of text including addresses, calendar dates, personal names, telephone numbers, ticker symbols, or tracking numbers in documents. A smart tag is denoted by a dotted purple underline underneath actionable text in a document; hovering over this text with the mouse cursor displays an icon that presents a list of related commands when invoked with a mouse click or the Alt+⇧ Shift+F10 keyboard shortcut. A ticker symbol smart tag in Excel can present the latest stock information in a cell within a workbook, for example, while a contact name smart tag in a Word document can display options to send an e-mail message to—or schedule a meeting with—that contact. Excel and Word support extensible smart tags that allow developers and organizations to display custom commands related to specific information. The smart tags used by Word are also available in Outlook 2002 if the former is configured as the default e-mail editor.

The AutoCorrect and Paste Options commands in previous versions of Office have been updated to include smart tags that are shared among all Office XP programs. The AutoCorrect smart tag provides individual options to revert an automatic correction or to prohibit an automatic correction from occurring in the future, and also provides access to the AutoCorrect Options dialog box. It is represented as a small, blue box when the mouse cursor is positioned over corrected text. The Paste Options smart tag provides options to retain original formatting of content, change the formatting based on the currently active program, or to provide contextually specific characteristics to content after users paste it from the clipboard.

After the release of Office XP, Microsoft provided a repository for downloadable smart tags on its website. Examples of third-party companies that produced smart tags after the release of Office XP include ESPN, Expedia, FedEx, and MSNBC. Microsoft released a Euro Currency Converter smart tag when new euro coins and notes were introduced.

==== Task panes ====
The Startup task pane in Word 2002

Office XP introduces a task pane interface that consolidates popular menu bar commands on the right side of the screen to facilitate quick access to them. Office XP includes Startup, Search, Clipboard, and Insert Clip Art task panes, as well as task panes that are exclusive to certain programs. Word 2002, for example, includes a task pane dedicated to style and formatting options. Users can switch between open task panes through the use of back and forward buttons; a drop-down list also presents specific task panes to which users can switch.

The default Startup task pane is automatically available when users launch an Office XP program and presents individual commands to open an existing file, create a new blank file or one from a template, add a network location, or open Office Help. The Search task pane includes individual Basic and Advanced modes and allows users to query local or remote locations for files. The Basic mode allows users to perform full-text searches, while the Advanced mode provides additional file property query options. An index such as the Indexing Service can improve how quickly results are returned after a search is performed.

The Insert Clip Art task pane is available in Excel, FrontPage, PowerPoint, and Word and provides options to search for and insert online clip art into files. The Office Clipboard has been redesigned as the Clipboard task pane across all Office XP programs and can accommodate up to 24 clipboard items compared to 12 in Office 2000. Clipboard items provide a visual representation to help users distinguish different types of content. The Office Clipboard task pane opens when at least two items are copied.

==== Other UI changes ====
- A Compress Pictures button on the Picture toolbar allows users to optimize images inserted into files.
- E-mail messages sent from all Office XP programs support an optional introductory field.
- Internet Explorer automatically launches the Office XP program used to create a HTML document when users print that document.
- Microsoft account users could store their documents in private or public locations at MSN Groups.
- Office XP introduces a My Data Sources directory in My Documents that provides access to recently opened data sources.
- Security features in all Office programs have been consolidated into a single Security tab.
- The Insert Hyperlink dialog box presents a list of files and folders from the current web page folder, allowing users to navigate between open web pages.
- The Web Options dialog box allows users to create documents tailored to Internet Explorer 4, Internet Explorer 5, Internet Explorer 6, or various versions of Netscape.
- When users revert automatically corrected text in an Office document to its original spelling, the text will not correct itself again.

=== File formats ===
==== XML support ====
Access 2002 and Excel 2002 support exporting and importing XML. Users can also save Excel workbooks as XML spreadsheets.

==== Office Open XML Compatibility Pack ====
Microsoft released a compatibility pack in 2006 for Office 2000 SP3, Office XP SP3, and Office 2003 SP1 that enables users to open, edit, and save Excel, PowerPoint, and Word Office Open XML documents introduced in Office 2007. The compatibility pack requires Windows 2000 SP4, Windows Server 2003, Windows XP SP1, or later versions of Windows. The update also enables compatibility with documents created in Office 2010, Office 2013, and Office 2016.

=== Alternative user input ===
==== Handwriting recognition ====
Office XP introduces handwriting recognition in all Office programs, allowing users to write with a mouse or stylus instead of entering text by typing on a keyboard. Users can insert handwritten notes into Excel, add handwritten comments to PowerPoint presentations, send handwritten e-mail messages with Outlook, or write directly into Word documents. Notes written with a handheld PC or a Pocket PC can be converted into Word documents, and handwritten content in Word documents can be converted to text. Word must be the active e-mail editor in Outlook before handwritten e-mail messages can be sent. Once installed, handwriting functionality is also available in Internet Explorer 5 and Outlook Express 5 or later. Handwriting recognition engines are available for the English, Simplified Chinese, Traditional Chinese, Japanese, and Korean versions of Office XP.

The downloadable Tablet Pack for Office XP provided an extension for Windows Journal to reuse notes as Outlook 2002 items and to import meeting information from Outlook 2002 into notes.

==== Speech recognition ====
Speech recognition based on Microsoft Research technology is available for all Office XP programs, allowing users to dictate text into active documents, to change document formatting, and to navigate the interface by voice. The speech recognition feature encompasses two different modes: Dictation, which transcribes spoken words into text; and Voice Command, which invokes interface features.

Speech recognition can be installed during Office XP setup or by clicking the Speech option in the Tools menu in Word 2002. When installed, it is available as a Microphone command on the Language toolbar that appears in the upper-right corner of the screen (lower-right corner in East-Asian versions of Office XP). When launched for the first time, speech recognition offers a tutorial to improve recognition accuracy, which begins by providing instructions to adjust the microphone for optimal performance. Speech recognition uses a speech profile to store information about a user's voice.

Users can configure speech recognition settings, including pronunciation sensitivity in voice command mode, accuracy and recognition response time in dictation mode, and microphone settings through the Speech control panel applet. The Regional and Language Options applet provides Language toolbar and additional settings. Speech recognition engines are available for the English, Japanese, and Simplified Chinese languages. Microsoft recommended its SideWinder Game Voicechat device as a microphone to use with speech recognition.

=== Reliability ===
With Office XP, Microsoft incorporated several features to address reliability issues observed in previous versions of Office:

- Application Recovery: Users can safely restart or terminate unresponsive Office programs—and save open documents before termination—from a utility that is accessible from the Office Tools group on the Windows Start menu.
- Automatic Recovery: Excel, PowerPoint, Publisher, and Word periodically save open documents in the background so the latest revision can be opened if an error occurs; users can configure how often files are saved, discard the latest revision, overwrite a file with it, or save it as a separate file.
- Document Recovery: Access, Excel, PowerPoint, and Word present users with an option to immediately save open files when an error occurs before a program is closed or restarted to prevent loss of data.
- Error Reporting: Users can optionally submit error report information to Microsoft for analysis to improve Office XP. Error reporting was instrumental in providing solutions included in all three Office XP service packs to address common issues. Error reports can also be submitted to corporate departments.
- Repair and Extract: Excel and Word can automatically recognize and repair corrupt documents; users can also manually repair documents from these programs.
- Safe Mode: Office XP programs will automatically launch in Safe Mode, a diagnostic mode that allows programs to bypass the source of a problem if they are unable to start properly.

=== Security ===
Excel, PowerPoint, and Word have been updated to provide password encryption options based on CryptoAPI. Additionally, all Office XP programs provide options for users to digitally sign documents.

=== Installation and deployment ===
When upgrading from a previous version of Office, Office XP retains the user's previous configuration. Office XP can also be installed directly from an administrative image hosted on a web server via HTTP, HTTPS, or FTP. The Office Resource Kit includes various improvements to deployment functionality when compared with the Office 2000 version. A new Setup INI Customization Wizard allows administrators to customize the Office XP INI configuration file prior to deployment. The Custom Installation Wizard can prohibit the installation, use, or uninstallation of programs or features such as the Run from Network and Installed on First Use setup options. Finally, the Custom Maintenance Wizard has been updated to provide customization options to configure Office XP including user preferences and security settings. The Save My Settings Wizard, introduced in Office 2000 as an optional download for Microsoft account users to remotely store their Office settings to the Office Update web site, has been updated to support importing and exporting backups to local storage or to a network share.

In an effort to curtail software piracy, Microsoft incorporated product activation technology into all versions of Office XP to prohibit users from installing a single copy of the software in a manner that violates the end-user license agreement (EULA). The EULA allows a single user to install one copy each on a primary device and a portable device such as a laptop. Users who make substantial hardware changes to an Office XP device may need to reactivate the software through the Internet or by telephone. Product activation does not require personally identifiable information.

Office XP introduced an optional subscription-based activation model that allowed consumers to annually license the product and receive incremental updates at a reduced price when compared with the cost of a full retail version. Microsoft originally intended to deliver the activation model to United States customers after the retail availability of Office XP on May 31, 2001, but later decided to make it available to consumers in "a few select locations" instead, citing a more cautious delivery approach. In spite of this, Microsoft distributed optical media and a single subscription to authorized U.S. retail partners who attended teamMicrosoft Live! events. As part of a pilot experiment, consumers in Australia, France, and New Zealand could purchase a subscription for Office XP starting in May 2001; the worldwide release of the activation model was contingent on the success of the pilot experiment, but Microsoft terminated support for subscriptions in 2002 based on feedback and research that demonstrated it was not well understood by consumers. Office 365—released over a decade after Office XP—has since reintroduced subscription-based licenses to consumers.

=== User assistance ===
A new "Ask a Question" feature appears in the top-right corner of all Office XP programs and allows users to type natural language questions and receive answers without opening the Office Assistant ("Clippy") or Office Help. Additionally, Office Help has been updated to aggregate and display content from the Internet in response to a query. The Office Assistant is now disabled by default and only appears when Help is activated.

== New application-specific features ==
New features in Word 2002

- A Clear Formatting option which reverts all changes made to selected text, but retains hyperlinks
- A Drawing Canvas allows content such as WordArt to be aligned to a fixed position
- For Indian languages, fonts with the Devanagari script and Tamil script are now rendered correctly thanks to updated version of Uniscribe. Also, proofing tools were introduced for Hindi, Marathi, Gujarati, Kannada, Punjabi, Tamil and Telugu.
- Non-real-time collaborative editing, allowing multiple users across a file share or server to edit a document and merge changes without requiring it to be unlocked; when a user is finished editing and closes the shared document, other users can view his or her edits and merge their own changes
- Multiple portions of text can be selected simultaneously in a document
- Styles for bulleted lists and tables
- Support for filtered web pages, which allows users to the reduce the size of a HTML document by removing XML tags and Word-specific formatting
- Support for watermarks in documents
- The General tab of the Properties dialog box now displays the file format of an open document
- Word count toolbar

New features in Excel 2002

- Border drawing with grid, line color, style, and weight options
- Colors can now be added to tabs in a worksheet
- Drawings and pictures can now be inserted directly as headers or footers
- Function argument information in tooltips
- If a cell contains a large number that its associated column is too narrow to display ("###"), Excel displays the entire number in a tooltip
- Numbers can be sorted as text to prevent unexpected sorting results that occur in mixed lists of numbers and text
- Phrasing of Excel alerts has been revised to be concise
- Users can evaluate formulas on a sequential basis to determine how Excel arrived at a calculation result
- With a Watch function, users can monitor the results of multiple cells in a separate window even when working on a different sheet or workbook

New features in Outlook 2002

- AutoComplete for email addresses
- Colored categories for calendar items
- Group schedules
- Hyperlink support in email subject lines
- Native support for Outlook.com
- Improved search functionality including the ability to stop a search and resume it later
  - Incremental search and content indexing is available if Windows Search is installed
- Lunar calendar support
- MSN Messenger integration
- Performance improvements
- Preview pane improvements including the ability to open hyperlinks; respond to meeting requests; and display email properties without opening a message
- Reminder window that consolidates all reminders for appointments and tasks in a single view
- Retention policies for documents and email
- Security improvements including the automatic blocking of potentially unsafe attachments and of programmatic access to information in Outlook
  - SP1 introduced the ability to view all non-digitally signed email or unencrypted email as plain text
  - SP2 allows users to—through the Registry—prevent the addition of new email accounts or the creation of new Personal Storage Tables
  - SP3 updates the object model guard security for applications that access messages and other items
- Smart tags when Word is configured as the default email editor

New features in PowerPoint 2002

- GDI+ accelerated graphic rendering, effects, and printing
- Images in slides can now be flipped and rotated
- Multiple slide masters in presentations
- Native support for diagrams such as cycle, pyramid, and Venn diagrams
- Presentation broadcast improvements
- Presenter tools that allow users to view details on upcoming bullets or slides, and speaker notes, and to navigate to any slide without these actions being visible to the audience; this feature requires a multi-monitor configuration
- Print preview
- Smart tags for Apply Automatic Layout and AutoFit features, the latter of which has been updated to automatically resize fonts to fit slides as users type and to remove the minimum font size limitation
- Support for additional paper sizes for printing
- Thumbnails of slides are now displayed within a left-hand pane of the interface
- Users can now snap objects to a grid and display drawing guides

New features in Access 2002

- A new file format that enables faster access and data processing for large databases; the Access 2000 format is used by default
- A new Stored Procedure Designer allows users to create or modify simple Microsoft SQL Server stored procedures
- Batch updates for Access projects
- Conversion error logging, which creates a table with information about each error that occurs during Access 95, Access 97, or Access 2000 database conversion
- Enhanced international support including the ability to change the left-to-right reading directionality
- Support for multiple Undo and Redo operations
- Support for PivotCharts and PivotTables

New features in Publisher 2002

- Customizable toolbars
- Font schemes that can be shared with Word
- Header and footer support
- Multiple publications can now be open simultaneously
- Print preview
- Support for OfficeArt
- The new Format dialog box combines the Colors and Lines, Layout, Picture, Size, Text Box, and Web tabs
- Users can export objects, pages, or groups of objects and pages as images
- Users can open, edit, and save publications as HTML
- Visual Basic for Applications (VBA) support
- Word documents can now be imported directly to Publisher

New features in FrontPage 2002

- Automatic web content from third parties, including Expedia and MSNBC
- Internet forums and online surveys can be integrated with websites
- HTML 4 features including button and fieldsets in forms, inline frames, and language attributes
- Tabs to navigate between different pages within the interface
- Tags in HTML pages can be automatically reformatted to be XML-compliant
- Themes from previous FrontPage versions have been updated
- Unicode support
- Users can now publish websites in the background and can continue to make edits during the publishing process
- Usage analysis reports in daily, weekly, or monthly increments allow users to determine how often a web page is accessed and the URL from which this access originates; reports can be exported to Excel or as HTML

== Removed features ==
- Binder was replaced by Unbind, a program that can extract the contents of a Binder file. Unbind can be installed from the Office XP CD-ROM.
- Microsoft Photo Editor no longer supports the PCX image format
- Office XP Small Business Edition removes the Small Business Customer Manager during an upgrade from Office 2000; the feature is not removed during an upgrade to the Professional edition. Users who desire to retain the Small Business Customer Manager must apply the Small Business Tools 2000 patch from the second Office 2000 CD-ROM before upgrading to the Small Business Edition of Office XP.
- Microsoft Map was removed from Excel 2002
- In Excel 2002, several add-ins are no longer available. Some, but not all, are integrated into Excel 2002 and thus made redundant.
- The .DBF files for Samples.xls and two Japanese templates are removed in Excel 2002
- Microsoft Query is no longer available
- In PowerPoint 2002, the Custom Soundtracks add-in is no longer supported and the Routing Recipient option on the Send To menu was removed.
- A number of features were removed in Outlook 2002

== Editions ==
The component products were packaged together in various suites. Some of these editions were available as retail packages in either full or upgrade versions, others as full OEM versions for inclusion with new PCs, and still others as volume license versions that required no activation. All editions provided the core components of Word, Excel, and Outlook, and all editions except the Small Business edition provided PowerPoint. Additionally, a Special Edition upgrade-only version was released with an Office XP-branded IntelliMouse Explorer, and some copies included Office XP Media Content on a separate disk.

Table of editions
Features	Standard for Students and Teachers	Standard	Professional	Small Business	Professional with Publisher	Professional with FrontPage	Professional Special Edition	Developer
Licensing scheme	Academic	Retail	Retail and volume	OEM	OEM	Volume	Retail	Retail, MSDN
Word 2002	Yes	Yes	Yes	Yes	Yes	Yes	Yes	Yes
Excel 2002	Yes	Yes	Yes	Yes	Yes	Yes	Yes	Yes
Outlook 2002	Yes	Yes	Yes	Yes	Yes	Yes	Yes	Yes
PowerPoint 2002	Yes	Yes	Yes	No	Yes	Yes	Yes	Yes
Access 2002	No	No	Yes	No	Yes	Yes	Yes	Yes
Publisher 2002	No	No	No	Yes	Yes	No	Yes	No
FrontPage 2002	No	No	No	No	No	Yes	Yes	Yes
Developer tools	No	No	No	No	No	No	No	Yes
MapPoint 2002	No	No	No	No	No	No	No	No
Data Analyzer 2002	No	No	No	No	No	No	No	No
Visio 2002	No	No	No	No	No	No	No	No
Project 2002	No	No	No	No	No	No	No	No

== System requirements ==
Office XP system requirements
Requirement	Minimum	Recommended
Microsoft Windows
Operating system	Windows NT 4.0 SP6 or later	
CPU	Intel Pentium 133 MHz; Intel Pentium II 400 MHz required for speech recognition	Intel Pentium III
Memory	Windows 98: 24 MB; Windows NT 4.0/Me: 32 MB; Windows 2000: 64 MB; Windows XP: 128 MB; An additional 8 MB is required per each Office app running simultaneously 128 MB is required for speech recognition	128 MB
Free space	210 MB (Standard); 245 MB (Professional, Professional Special Edition); 450 MB (Developer); Each edition requires an additional 115 MB on the hard disk where the operating system is installed	
Media	A CD-ROM drive is required to install Office XP from optical media	
Graphics hardware	800×600 (SVGA) with 256 colors	Hardware accelerated video card or MMX processor
Sound hardware	An audio output device and microphone are required for speech recognition	
Network	Collaboration features require Office 97 or later Internet access is required for product activation and online functionality	
Input device(s)	Mouse and keyboard	Touchscreen for handwriting functionality

== Reception ==
Microsoft Office XP received mixed to positive reviews after its release. CNET praised the new collaboration and data recovery features and stated that Office XP offered a "host of incremental improvements" over its predecessor, Office 2000, but ultimately concluded that "most enhancements and additions are better suited for groups than individuals." Criticism was also directed at the productivity suite's strict hard disk space requirement and its incompatibility with Windows 95. Nevertheless, CNET awarded Office XP a 4-star editors' rating. PC Magazine rated Office XP 4 stars out of 5 and praised the product's emphasis on user control, particularly in regards to customization options for features introduced in previous versions, and regarded it as "one of the few Microsoft upgrades that offers almost no pains with its significant gains." The New York Times stated that Office XP "isn't so much a list of new features as it is an improved arrangement of old ones," but offered praise for the new collaboration features, which were regarded as a "huge leap" from previous versions. Paul Thurrott regarded Office XP as "a must-have upgrade for writers such as myself," though he also stated that, without the new smart tags feature, it "has the feel of a minor upgrade with numerous useful, but small, changes."

While most assessments of Office XP were positive, the speech recognition feature was frequently criticized due to its inaccuracy and lack of advanced functionality. CNET regarded it as "especially lame" because of its inability to recognize text editing commands such as "select the sentence" and because it required users to manually switch between command and dictation modes. PC Magazine stated that both the speech recognition and handwriting recognition features were not "reliable enough for general use." However, in a later assessment, PC Magazine stated that the "speech recognition is reasonably accurate, but there are very few commands for editing and correcting text" and recommended Dragon NaturallySpeaking, IBM ViaVoice, or Voice Xpress for dictation. The New York Times speculated that Microsoft had little to no confidence in the feature, as it is not installed by default and no microphone is included with Office XP; however, it concluded that it was "not bad for a freebie, especially if you would rather get the first draft down quickly and clean up the recognition errors later." Paul Thurrott stated that "the voice recognition is so bad it's almost not even worth discussing," concluding that it "is sort of a joke" when compared with mature products such as Dragon NaturallySpeaking.

== See also ==
- .NET My Services
- Comparison of office suites
- List of office suites
- Windows Speech Recognition
