= Microsoft Office shared tools =

Components included in all Microsoft Office products

Microsoft Office shared tools are software components that are included in all Microsoft Office products. These software utilities give users of Microsoft Office Suite access to more advanced or specialized features.

== Delve ==

Office Delve allows Microsoft 365 (formerly called Office 365) users to search and manage their emails, meetings, contacts, social networks and documents stored on OneDrive or Sites in Microsoft 365. Delve uses machine learning and artificial intelligence. In April 2015 Microsoft launched a mobile version of Office Delve in the App Store and Google Play for users with a Microsoft 365 subscription. In 2017, Microsoft dropped the Delve app from the Microsoft Store. In December 2024, Microsoft annoucemnt would retired on web.

== Graph ==
Microsoft Graph (originally known as Microsoft Chart) is an OLE application deployed by Microsoft Office programs such as Excel and Access to create charts and graphs. The program is available as an OLE application object in Visual Basic. Microsoft Graph supports many different types of charts, but its output is dated. Office 2003 was the last version to use Microsoft Graph for hosting charts inside Office applications as OLE objects. Office 2007 – specifically, Excel 2007 – includes a new integrated charting engine, and the charts are native to the applications. The new engine supports advanced formatting, including 3D rendering, transparencies, and shadows. Chart layouts can also be customized to highlight various trends in the data. Microsoft Graph still exists for compatibility reasons, but the entry points are removed. This product can be used within other products, and is available in the Object menu in the Insert tab in Office Programs. Sold separately in Mac releases.

The first software sold under the name Microsoft Chart was an attempt by Microsoft to compete with the successful Lotus 1-2-3 by adding a companion to Microsoft Multiplan, the company's spreadsheet in the early 1980s. Microsoft Chart shared its box design and two-line menu with Multiplan, and could import Multiplan data. The simple graphs (pies, bars, lines) were drawn on the screen in graphics mode (which was not available on entry level computer models), and could not be printed on some dot matrix devices. The main drawback of Microsoft's solution at the time was the need to exit Multiplan and then load Chart to compose and draw a graph, because MS-DOS was not a multitasking operating system. In the early 1990s, Microsoft Chart was renamed Microsoft Graph.

== WordArt ==
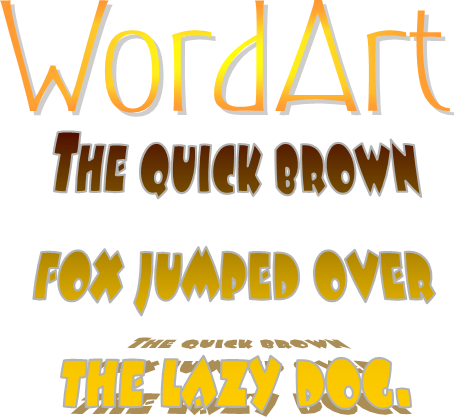
An example image created with WordArt.

WordArt is a text-styling utility, created by Scott Forstall and Nat Brown (later Apple employees) while interning for Microsoft in 1991. It allows users to create stylized text with various "special effects" such as textures, outlines, and many other manipulations that are not available through the standard font formatting. For example, one can create shadows, rotate, "bend", and "stretch" the shape of the text. WordArt is available in 30 different preset styles in Microsoft Word, however, it is customizable using the tools available on the WordArt toolbar and Drawing toolbar up to Office 2003, or on the WordArt tools tab since Office 2007. It is also available in Excel, Microsoft PowerPoint, and Microsoft Publisher. In Office 2010 and beyond, users can apply formatting effects such as shadow, bevel, glow, gradient glow, and reflection to their text.

In Office 2007, WordArt was given a complete overhaul in Excel and PowerPoint, with new styles, new effects, and the ability to apply WordArt to regular text boxes, and in Word, to body text. The new styles were included in Word 2010, but the presets revamped in Word 2013.

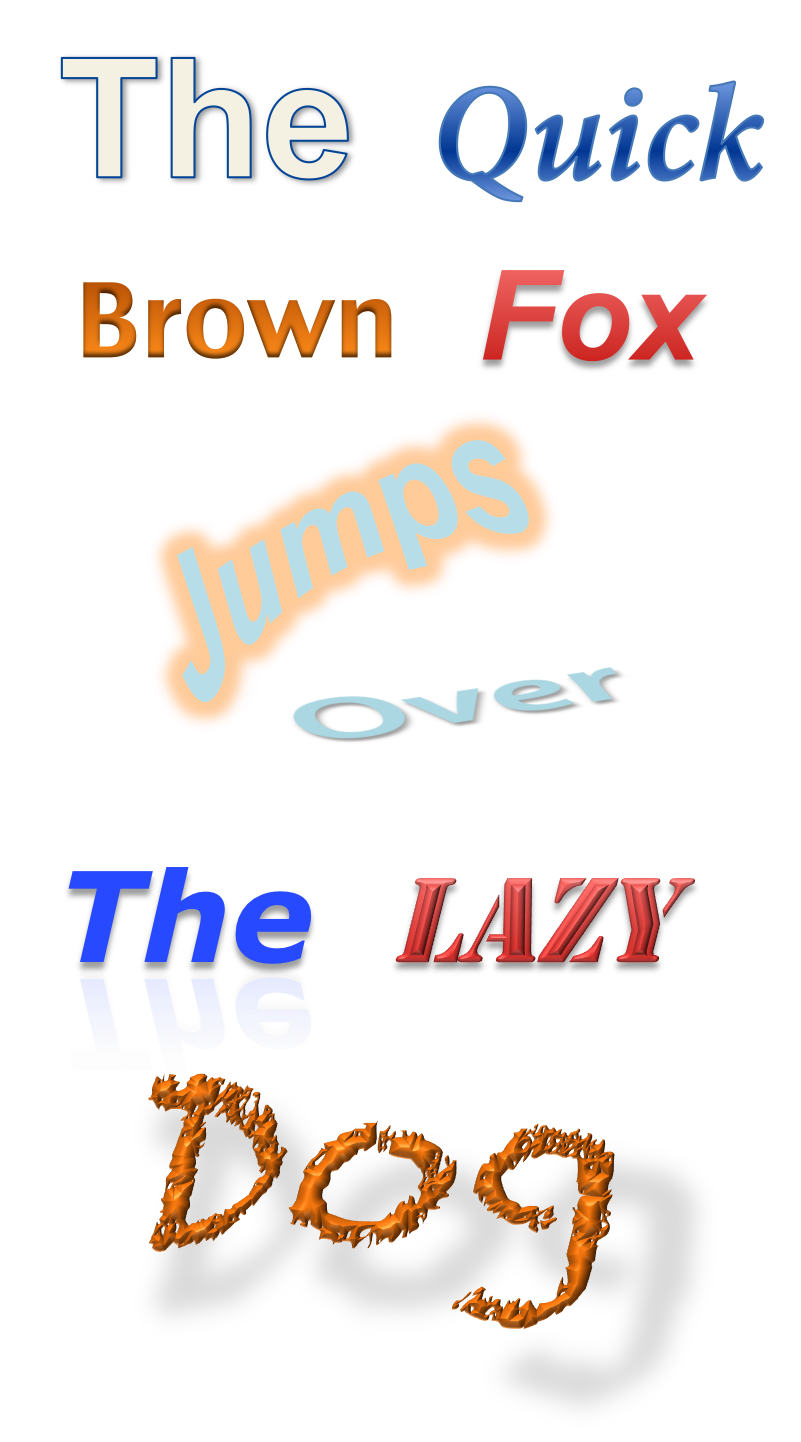
WordArt created in PowerPoint for Mac 2011

== SmartArt ==
SmartArt, found under the Insert tab in the ribbon in PowerPoint, Word, Excel, and Outlook, is a new group of editable and formatted diagrams. There are 115 preset SmartArt graphics layout templates in categories such as list, process, cycle, and hierarchy. When an instance of a SmartArt is inserted, a Text Pane appears next to it to guide the user through entering text in the hierarchical levels. Each SmartArt graphic, based on its design, maps the text outline, automatically resized for best fit, onto the graphic. There are a number of "quick styles" for each graphic that apply largely different 3D effects to the graphic, and the graphic's shapes and text can be formatted through shape styles and WordArt styles. In addition, SmartArt graphics change their colors, fonts, and effects to match the document's theme. It was included in Office since 2006 to now.

== Discontinued ==
=== Binder ===
Microsoft Binder was an application originally included with Microsoft Office 95, 97, and 2000 that allowed users to include different types of OLE 2.0 objects (e.g., documents, spreadsheets, presentations and projects) in one file. Originally a test host for OLE 2.0, it was not widely used, and was discontinued after Office 2000.

The filename extension for Microsoft Binder files was .OBD; the Office Binder template format was .OBT. A Microsoft Office Binder Wizard used the extension .OBZ.

Binder was no longer shipped with Office versions starting from XP. Office XP and Office 2003 comes with an optional Unbind utility that, upon execution, extracts the contents of the Binder document to a directory of the user’s choosing. This utility may be installed either through the Add or Remove Features functionality of Microsoft Office’s installation wizard or online from Microsoft Download Center.

=== Small Business Tools ===
Small Business Customer Manager (SBCM) was an Access-based tool which combined accounting data from most popular accounting software and Outlook contacts and allowed user to track customer profiles and maximize revenue. It integrated seamlessly with Word and Publisher.

Small Business Financial Manager (SBFM) was an Excel-based tool which allowed users to analyze data and create reports and charts based on a created from user's accounting data from popular accounting packages (i.e. QuickBooks). It was first released in 1996 and bundled with Small Business editions of Office 97 or with every Office 2000 suite except Standard. Originally it was created for Microsoft by Timeline Inc. and originally was called Accounting Analysis Pack. It was available in United States, Canada, United Kingdom and Australia.

List of SBFM versions:

- Small Business Financial Manager for Excel for Windows 95 (1.0) (1996)
- Small Business Financial Manager 97 (2.0) (Office 97 Small Business Edition 1.0) (1997)
- Small Business Financial Manager 98 (3.0) (Office 97 Small Business Edition 2.0) (1998); added business comparison, projection reports, charts
- Small Business Financial Manager 2000 (4.0) (Office 2000 Small Business, Professional, Premium, Developer) (1999); added buy vs lease tool separate from What-If analysis)

Direct Mail Manager (DMM) was an-Internet-based tool which allowed businesses to conduct direct mail campaigns by importing address lists from Outlook, Excel, Access etc., verifying address lists by connecting to an Internet Site (ZIP-Station), printing envelopes, postcards and letters and using a mailing service. Originally it was released with Office 97 Small Business Edition 2.0 and subsequently bundled with every Office 2000 suite except Standard. This program was developed in association with Envelope Manager Software. An enhanced version called DAZzle Express was available from Envelope Manager Software. Additionally, Direct Mail Manager was available for United States, United Kingdom, Germany, France and Italy.

Business Planner (MSBP) contained business-planning resources, templates, articles, advice from experts. It allowed user to create a business plan and a marketing plan (US only). It was available for United States, Canada, United Kingdom, Australia, Germany and France.

=== Data Analyzer ===
Microsoft Data Analyzer 2002 was part of Microsoft Office XP. Microsoft originally purchased the software as part of the intellectual property of Maximal Innovative Intelligence - Maximal's "Max" product was rebranded as Microsoft Data Analyzer. Even though it was a stand-alone application and was not available in any Office XP bundle, it was a part of the Office XP suite. It was not updated beyond version 3.5.

Microsoft Data Analyzer allows analyzing and visualizing data and data trends, and is integrated with SQL Server Analysis Services. Reports and graphs generated could be saved as HTML, Microsoft Excel, or Microsoft PowerPoint files.

=== Document Scanning and Document Imaging ===
Microsoft Office Document Scanning (MODS) is a scanning and optical character recognition (OCR) application introduced first in Office XP. The OCR engine is based upon Nuance's OmniPage. MODS is suited for creating archival copies of documents. It can embed OCR data into both MDI and TIFF files. This enables text search on the files, which is integrated into the Windows Search.

Microsoft Office Document Imaging (MODI) enables editing and annotating documents scanned by Microsoft Office Document Scanning. It was first introduced in Office XP, and was included in Office 2003 and Office 2007. Although it is not available in Office 2010, it is possible to install it from a previous version of Microsoft Office and use it with Office 2010. (The Internet Fax feature in Office 2010 uses the Windows Fax printer driver to generate a TIFF file instead.) Microsoft offers MDI to TIFF File Converter, a command line tool, which allows users to convert one or more MDI files to TIFF.

MODI supports Tagged Image File Format (TIFF) as well as its own proprietary format called MDI. It can save text generated from the OCR process into the original TIFF file. However, MODI produces TIFF files that violate the TIFF standard specifications and are only usable by itself.

In its default mode, the OCR engine will de-skew and re-orient the page where required.

Since Office 2003 Service Pack 3, MODI no longer takes over the file association with Tagged Image File Format (TIFF) files as part of the Service Pack's security changes. Also, it no longer supports JPEG compression in TIFF files.

MODS and MODI are no longer available since Office 2010, although Microsoft recommends a workaround by installing the MODI component from SharePoint Designer 2007 or old Office media.

==== Programmability ====
MODI exposes a document and an image object through Component Object Model (COM). It can convert scanned images to text under program control, using its built-in OCR engine.

The MODI object model is accessible from development tools that support the Component Object Model (COM) by using a reference to the Microsoft Office Document Imaging 11.0 Type Library. The MODI Viewer control is accessible from any development tool that supports ActiveX controls by adding Microsoft Office Document Imaging Viewer Control 11.0 or 12.0 (MDIVWCTL.DLL) to the application project. These folders are usually located in C:\Program Files\Common Files\Microsoft Shared\MODI.

The MODI control became accessible in the Office 2003 release; while the associated programs were included in earlier Office XP, the object model was not exposed to programmatic control.

A simple example in Visual Basic .NET follows:

Dim inputFile As String = "C:\test\multipage.tiff"
Dim strRecText As String = ""
Dim Doc1 As MODI.Document

Doc1 = New MODI.Document
Doc1.Create(inputFile)
Doc1.OCR()  ' this will OCR all pages of a multi-page TIFF file
Doc1.Save() ' this will save the deskewed reoriented images, and the OCR text, back to the inputFile

For imageCounter As Integer = 0 To (Doc1.Images.Count - 1) ' work your way through each page of results
    strRecText &= Doc1.Images(imageCounter).Layout.Text    ' this puts the OCR results into a string
Next

File.AppendAllText("C:\test\testmodi.txt", strRecText)     ' write the OCR file out to disk

Doc1.Close() ' clean up
Doc1 = Nothing

==== MDI file format ====
Microsoft Document Imaging (MDI)
- Filename extension: .mdi
- Internet media type: image/vnd.ms-modi
- Magic number: 0x5045
- Type of format: Image file formats
- Extended from: TIFF

MODI uses a proprietary format with .mdi Filename extension for storing scanned documents together with optional annotations or metadata which can include the text generated by OCR process. It is known that MDI is a variant of TIFF. Key differences from TIFF include:

- Magic number is 0x5045, instead of TIFF's 0x4D4D (ASCII MM) or 0x4949 (ASCII II).
- Three proprietary image compression formats are used.
- Numerous proprietary tag values are used.

=== Office Web Components ===
Office Web Components (OWC) are a group of Object Linking and Embedding (OLE) components available in Office 2000, XP, and 2003. These ActiveX Controls can be plugged into web pages, Visual Basic, Visual Basic for Applications (VBA) forms, and Windows Forms, or programmed in-memory. The OWC can be used by any COM-compliant Component Object Model programming language. Applications such as Excel, Microsoft Access, Microsoft Project and Microsoft FrontPage allowed creating interactive web pages using Office Web Components.

The following components are included:

- Spreadsheet
- Chartspace
- Pivot table
- Data source component

The Office Web Components were discontinued in Office 2007 except as a part of Office Project Server 2007. However, they were available for download from Microsoft's website. Microsoft has not yet offered a complete OWC replacement. However, programmers can use a combination of third-party products, Excel Services, or Visual Studio Tools for Office to provide similar functionality.

The Pivot Table web component may have problems on Windows 7. In many cases the problems are related to the new security settings in IE and can be solved by relaxing the restrictions in the relevant Internet Zone, allowing ActiveX controls and possibly cross-domain access. If the page is hosted locally in the computer, the settings for the zone are not accessible through the IE interface, and can be changed by editing the registry (under key [HKEY_CURRENT_USER\Software\Microsoft\Windows\CurrentVersion\Internet Settings\Zones\0]).

Four books in print cover OWC programming:

- The O.W.C Black Book 2nd Edition - Alvin Bruney 2007
- The Microsoft Office Web Components Black Book with .NET - Alvin Bruney 2005
- Professional ASP Programming Guide for Office Web Components: With Office 2000 and Office XP - Qimao Zhang 2001
- Programming Microsoft Office 2000 Web Components - Dave Stearns 2000

=== Clip Organizer ===
Microsoft Clip Organizer is Microsoft's clip art organizing software allowing users to find drawings, photographs, sounds, videos, and other media clips to include in presentations, publications, and other Office documents. It comes with a variety of stock media clips and offers more selection on the Microsoft Office Online website.

=== Equations ===
Equation Editor was a formula editor developed by Design Science that allowed users to construct math and science equations in a WYSIWYG environment, and was included in Microsoft Office and several other commercial applications. It was a simplified version of Design Science's MathType, evidenced with a dialog box enticing the user to upgrade to the full, paid version of the software. It could be used as a standalone program or as an embedded object from within applications that support OLE. Its feature set had not changed significantly since its introduction in Word for Windows version 2.0. Equation Editor is no longer the default method of creating equations, and is kept for compatibility with old documents only. In January 2018, Microsoft published a security update that completely removed the old Equation Editor for Office 2007, Office 2010, Office 2013 and Office 2016 when the update was installed, due to a vulnerability that was being actively exploited.

Beginning with Office 2007, a reengineered math facility is included, which is built into the document-editing part of the Fluent User Interface on core Office 2007 programs and all Office 2010 and 2013 programs, rather than accessed through a separate dialog and being treated as an OLE object in the document. The new facility has been retronamed OfficeMath.
