= Microsoft Office 2007 =

Version of Microsoft Office

- Microsoft Office 2007 applications from top left to bottom right: Word, Excel, PowerPoint and Outlook which collectively make up the Standard edition.
- Developer: Microsoft
- Release: January 30, 2007; 19 years ago
- Final release: Service Pack 3 (12.0.6798.5000) / October 10, 2017; 9 years ago
- Operating system: Windows XP SP2 or later Windows Server 2003 SP1 or later
- Platform: IA-32
- Predecessor: Microsoft Office 2003 (2003)
- Successor: Microsoft Office 2010 (2010)
- Available in: English, Arabic, Simplified Chinese, Traditional Chinese, Czech, Danish, Dutch, Estonian, Finnish, French, German, Greek, Hebrew, Hindi, Hungarian, Italian, Japanese, Korean, Latvian, Lithuanian, Norwegian (Bokmål), Polish, Portuguese, Romanian, Russian, Slovak, Slovenian, Spanish, Swedish, Thai, Turkish, and Ukrainian.
- Type: Office suite
- License: Trialware
- Website: Microsoft Office 2007 (Archived at Wayback Machine)

Microsoft Office 2007 (codenamed Office 12), sometimes called the "2007 Microsoft Office system", is an office suite for Windows, developed and published by Microsoft. It was officially revealed on March 9, 2006 and was the 12th version of Microsoft Office. It was released to manufacturing on November 3, 2006; it was subsequently made available to volume license customers on November 30, 2006, and later to retail on January 30, 2007. The Mac OS X equivalent, Microsoft Office 2008 for Mac, was released on January 15, 2008.

Office 2007 introduced a new graphical user interface called the Fluent User Interface, which uses ribbons and an Office menu instead of menu bars and toolbars. Office 2007 also introduced Office Open XML file formats as the default file formats in Excel, PowerPoint, and Word. The new formats are intended to facilitate the sharing of information between programs, improve security, reduce the size of documents, and enable new recovery scenarios.

Office 2007 is compatible with Windows XP SP2 and Windows Server 2003 SP1 through Windows 10 v1607 and Windows Server 2016. It is the last version of Microsoft Office to support Windows XP SP2, Windows Server 2003 SP1 and Windows Vista RTM.

Office 2007 includes new applications and server-side tools, including Microsoft Office Groove, a collaboration and communication suite for smaller businesses, which was originally developed by Groove Networks before being acquired by Microsoft in 2005. Also included is SharePoint Server 2007, a major revision to the server platform for Office applications, which supports Excel Services, a client-server architecture for supporting Excel workbooks that are shared in real time between multiple machines, and are also viewable and editable through a web page.

With Microsoft FrontPage discontinued, Microsoft SharePoint Designer, which is aimed towards development of SharePoint portals, becomes part of the Office 2007 family. Its designer-oriented counterpart, Microsoft Expression Web, is targeted for general web development. However, neither application has been included in Office 2007 software suites.

Speech recognition functionality has been removed from the individual programs in the Office 2007 suite. Users must install a previous version of Office to use speech recognition features.

According to Forrester Research, as of May 2010, Microsoft Office 2007 is used in 81% of enterprises it surveyed (its sample comprising 115 North American and European enterprise and SMB decision makers).

Support for Office 2007 ended on October 10, 2017. On August 27, 2021, Microsoft announced that Outlook 2007 and Outlook 2010 would be cut off from connecting to Microsoft 365 Exchange servers on November 1, 2021.

== Development ==
Microsoft announced Beta 1 of Office 2007 with the reveal of the ribbon user interface on March 9, 2006, at CeBIT in Germany.

Beta 2 was announced by Bill Gates at WinHEC 2006, and was initially released to the public at no cost from Microsoft's web site. However, because of an unprecedented number of downloads, a fee of $1.50 was introduced for each product downloaded after August 2, 2006, The beta was updated on September 14, 2006, in Beta 2 Technical Refresh (Beta2TR). It included an updated user interface, better accessibility support, improvements in the robustness of the platform, and greater functionality.

Office 2007 was released to volume licensing customers on November 30, 2006, and to the general public on January 30, 2007. The last security updates were released on April 10, 2018.

=== Service packs ===
Since the initial release of Microsoft Office 2007, three service packs containing updates as well as additional features have been released. Microsoft Office 2007 Service Packs are cumulative, so previous Service Packs are not a prerequisite for installation.

Service Pack 1 was released on December 11, 2007. Official documentation claims that SP1 is not simply a rollup of publicly released patches, but that it also contains fixes for a total of 481 issues throughout the entire Office suite. Service Pack 2 was released on April 28, 2009. It added improved support for ODF, XPS and PDF standards, and included several bug fixes. Service Pack 3 was released on October 25, 2011.

== Editions ==
Comparison of Microsoft Office 2007 editions
Programs and Features	Basic	Home and Student	Standard	Small Business	Professional	Professional Plus	Enterprise	Ultimate
Licensing scheme	OEM	Retail and OEM	Retail and volume	Retail, OEM and volume	Retail and OEM	Volume	Volume	Retail
Word	Yes	Yes	Yes	Yes	Yes	Yes	Yes	Yes
Excel	Yes	Yes	Yes	Yes	Yes	Yes	Yes	Yes
PowerPoint	Viewer only	Yes	Yes	Yes	Yes	Yes	Yes	Yes
Outlook	Yes	No	Yes	Yes	Yes	Yes	Yes	Yes
OneNote	No	Yes	No	No	No	No	Yes	Yes
Picture Manager	No	Yes	Yes	Yes	Yes	Yes	Yes	Yes
Publisher	No	No	No	Yes	Yes	Yes	Yes	Yes
Access	No	No	No	No	Yes	Yes	Yes	Yes
InfoPath	No	No	No	No	No	Yes	Yes	Yes
Communicator	No	No	No	No	No	Yes	Yes	No
Groove	No	No	No	No	No	No	Yes	Yes
Project	No	No	No	No	No	No	No	No
SharePoint Designer	No	No	No	No	No	No	No	No
Visio	Viewer only	Viewer only	Viewer only	Viewer only	Viewer only	Viewer only	Viewer only	Viewer only
Office Customization Tool (OCT)	No	No	Volume licensing only	Volume licensing only	No	Yes	Yes	No
Upgrade MSRP	?	—N/a	$239.95	$279.95	$329.95	?	?	$539.95
Full MSRP	?	$149.95	$399.95	$449.95	$499.95	?	?	$679.95

^{1} Office Customization Tool is used to customize the installation of Office 2007 by creating a Windows Installer patch file (.MSP) and replacing the Custom Installation Wizard and Custom Deployment Wizard included in earlier versions of the Office Resource Kit that created a Windows Installer Transform (.MST).

=== Volume licensing ===
Eligible employees of companies with volume license agreements for Microsoft Office receive additional tools, including enterprise content management, electronic forms, Information Rights Management capabilities and copies for use on a home computer. Office 2007 was the last to implement offline VLKs. Future versions would need to connect to the internet to activate.

== New features ==
=== User interface ===
The new user interface (UI), officially known as Fluent User Interface, has been implemented in the core Microsoft Office applications: Word, Excel, PowerPoint, Access, and in the item inspector used to create or edit individual items in Outlook. These applications have been selected for the UI overhaul because they center around document authoring. The rest of the applications in the suite changed to the new UI in subsequent versions. Original prototypes of the new user interface were revealed at MIX 2008 in Las Vegas.

In Office 2007, Calibri (/kəˈliːbri/) replaced Times New Roman as the default typeface in Word and replaced Arial as the default in PowerPoint, Excel and Outlook. It is a digital sans-serif typeface family in the humanist or modern style. It was designed by Luc(as) de Groot in 2002 and released to the general public in 2004.

==== Office button ====
The Office 2007 button, located on the top-left of the window, replaces the File menu and provides access to functionality common across all Office applications, including opening, saving, printing, and sharing a file. It can also close the application. Users can also choose color schemes for the interface. A notable accessibility improvement is that the Office button follows Fitts's law.

==== Ribbon ====
The ribbon, a panel that houses a fixed arrangement of command buttons and icons, organizes commands as a set of tabs, each grouping relevant commands. The ribbon is present in Microsoft Word 2007, Excel 2007, PowerPoint 2007, Access 2007 and some Outlook 2007 windows. The ribbon is not user customizable in Office 2007. Each application has a different set of tabs that exposes functions that the application offers. For example, while Excel has a tab for the graphing capabilities, Word does not; instead it has tabs to control the formatting of a text document. Within each tab, various related options may be grouped together. The ribbon is designed to make the features of the application more discoverable and accessible with fewer mouse clicks as compared to the menu-based UI used prior to Office 2007. Moving the mouse scroll wheel while on any of the tabs on the ribbon cycles through the tabs. The ribbon can be minimized by double clicking the active section's title, such as the Home text in the picture below. Office 2007 does not natively support removing, modifying or replacing ribbon. Third party add-ins, however, can bring menus and toolbars back to Office 2007 or customize the ribbon commands. Add-ins that restore menus and toolbars include Classic Menu for Office, ToolbarToggle, and Ubitmenu. Others like RibbonCustomizer enable the customization of ribbons. Office 2010 does allow user customization of the ribbon out of the box.

The ribbon in Microsoft PowerPoint 2007

==== Contextual Tabs ====
Some tabs, called Contextual Tabs, appear only when certain objects are selected. Contextual Tabs expose functionality specific only to the object with focus. For example, selecting a picture brings up a new tab showing toolbar actions specific to the selected photo.

==== Live Preview ====
Microsoft Office 2007 also introduces a feature called Live Preview, which temporarily applies formatting on the focused text or object when any formatting button is moused-over. The temporary formatting is removed when the mouse pointer is moved from the button. This allows users to have a preview of how the option would affect the appearance of the object, without actually applying it.

==== Mini Toolbar ====
The new Mini Toolbar is a small toolbar with basic formatting commands that appears within the document editing area, much like a context menu. When the mouse selects part of the text, Mini Toolbar appears close to selected text. It remains semi-transparent until the mouse pointer is hovered on it, to avoid obstructing what is underneath. Mini Toolbar can also be made to appear by right-clicking in the editing area or via ≣ Menu key on keyboard, in which case it appears near the cursor, above or below the traditional context menu. Mini Toolbar is not customizable in Office 2007, but can be turned off.

==== Quick Access Toolbar ====
The Quick Access toolbar (by default) sits in the title bar and serves as a repository of most used functions, such as save, undo/redo and print. It is customizable, although this feature is limited, compared to toolbars in previous Office versions. Any command available in the entire Office application can be added to the Quick Access toolbar, including commands not available on the ribbon as well as macros. Keyboard shortcuts for any of the commands on the toolbar are also fully customizable, similar to previous Office versions.

==== Other UI features ====
- Super-tooltips, or screentips, that can house formatted text and even images, are used to provide detailed descriptions of what most buttons do.
- A zoom slider present in the bottom-right corner, allowing for dynamic and rapid magnification of documents.
- The status bar is fully customizable. Users can right click the status bar and add or remove what they want the status bar to display.

=== SmartArt ===
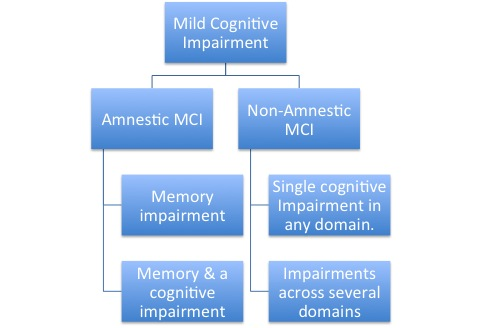
SmartArt in PowerPoint

SmartArt, found under the Insert tab in the ribbon in PowerPoint, Word, Excel, and Outlook, is a new group of editable and formatted diagrams. There are 115 preset SmartArt graphics layout templates in categories such as list, process, cycle, and hierarchy. When an instance of a SmartArt is inserted, a Text Pane appears next to it to guide the user through entering text in the hierarchical levels. Each SmartArt graphic, based on its design, maps the text outline, automatically resized for best fit, onto the graphic. There are a number of "quick styles" for each graphic that apply largely different 3D effects to the graphic, and the graphic's shapes and text can be formatted through shape styles and WordArt styles. In addition, SmartArt graphics change their colors, fonts, and effects to match the document's theme.

=== File formats ===
==== Office Open XML ====
Microsoft Office 2007 introduced a new file format, called Office Open XML, as the default file format. Such files are saved using an extra X letter in their extension (.docx/xlsx/pptx/etc.). However, it can still save documents in the old format, which is compatible with previous versions. Alternatively, Microsoft has made available a free add-on known as the Microsoft Office Compatibility Pack that lets Office open, edit, and save documents created under the newer 2007 format.

Office Open XML is based on XML and uses the ZIP file container. According to Microsoft, documents created in this format are up to 75% smaller than the same documents saved with previous Microsoft Office file formats, owing to the ZIP data compression.

Files containing macros are saved with an extra M letter in their extension instead (.docm/xlsm/pptm/etc.).

==== PDF ====
Initially, Microsoft promised to support exporting to Portable Document Format (PDF) in Office 2007. However, due to legal objections from Adobe Systems, Office 2007 originally did not offer PDF support out of the box, but rather as a separate free download. However, starting with Service Pack 2, Office allows users to natively export PDF files.

==== XPS ====
Office 2007 documents can also be exported as XPS documents. This is part of Service Pack 2 and prior to that, was available as a free plug-in in a separate download.

==== OpenDocument ====
Microsoft backs an open-source effort to support OpenDocument in Office 2007, as well as earlier versions (up to Office 2000), through a converter add-in for Word, Excel and PowerPoint, and also a command-line utility. As of 2008, the project supports conversion between ODF and Office Open XML file formats for all three applications. According to ODF Alliance this support falls short and substantial improvements are still needed for interoperability in real-world situations. Third-party plugins able to read from and write to the ISO-standard Open Document Format (ODF) are available as a separate download.

Office 2007 Service Pack 2 adds native support for the OpenDocument Format. The ODF Alliance has released test results on ODF support of Office 2007 SP2, concluding that Office ODF support, both SP2 and other add-ons, have "serious shortcomings that, left unaddressed, would break the open standards based interoperability that the marketplace, especially governments, is demanding". Particularly, SP2 has no support for encrypted ODF files and has limited interoperability with other ODF spreadsheet implementations.

The ISO/IEC 26300 OpenDocument standard specifies encryption of files, which is based on sha1, Blowfish, and RFC 2898. Microsoft Office 2007 SP2 does not support reading and writing encrypted (password protected) ODF files. Users are presented with a message: “cannot use password protection using the ODF format.”

The ISO/IEC 26300 OpenDocument standard has no spreadsheet formula language included (or referenced) in the standard specification. Office 2007 SP2 uses the spreadsheet formula language specified in the ISO/IEC 29500 Office Open XML open standard when creating ODF documents. According to the ODF Alliance report "ODF spreadsheets created in Excel 2007 SP2 do not in fact conform to ODF 1.1 because Excel 2007 incorrectly encodes formulas with cell addresses. Section 8.3.1 of ODF 1.1 says that addresses in formulas "start with a "[" and end with a "]"." In Excel 2007 cell addresses were not enclosed with the necessary square brackets." The ISO/IEC 26300 specification states that the semantics and the syntax depends on the used namespace, which is implementation dependent, leaving the syntax implementation defined as well.

Microsoft stated that they consider adding support for an official ODF formula language (OpenFormula), once a future version of the ISO/IEC 26300 standard specification includes one.

Microsoft's ODF spreadsheet support in SP2 is not fully inter-operable with other implementations of OpenDocument, such as the IBM Symphony, which use the non-standardized OpenOffice.org 2.x formula language, and OpenOffice.org 3.x, which uses a draft of OpenFormula. The company had previously reportedly stated that "where ODF 1.1 is ambiguous or incomplete, the Office implementation can be guided by current practice in OpenOffice.org, mainly, and other implementations including KOffice and AbiWord. Peter Amstein and the Microsoft Office team are reluctant to make liberal use of extension mechanisms, even though provided in ODF 1.1. They want to avoid all appearance of an embrace-extend attempt."

The EU investigated Microsoft Office OpenDocument Format support to see if it provided consumers greater choice.

=== Metadata ===
In Office 2007, Microsoft introduced the Document Inspector, an integral metadata removal tool that strips Word, Excel, and PowerPoint documents of information such as author name and comments and other "metadata".

=== User assistance system ===
In Microsoft Office 2007, the Office Assistants were eliminated in favour of a new online help system. One of its features is the extensive use of Super Tooltips, which explain in about one paragraph what each function performs. Some of them also use diagrams or pictures. These appear and disappear like normal tooltips, and replace normal tooltips in many areas. The Help content also directly integrates searching and viewing Office Online articles.

=== Collaboration features ===
==== SharePoint ====
Microsoft Office 2007 includes features geared towards collaboration and data sharing. As such, Microsoft Office 2007 features server components for applications such as Excel, which work in conjunction with SharePoint Services, to provide a collaboration platform. SharePoint works with Microsoft Office SharePoint Server 2007, which is used to host a SharePoint site, and uses IIS and ASP.NET 2.0. Excel server exposes Excel Services, which allows any worksheet to be created, edited and maintained via web browsers. It features Excel Web Access, the client-side component which is used to render the worksheet on a browser, Excel Calculation Service which is the server side component which populates the worksheet with data and perform calculations, and Excel Web Services that extends Excel functionalities into individual web services. SharePoint can also be used to host Word documents for collaborative editing, by sharing a document. SharePoint can also be used to hold PowerPoint slides in a Slide Library, from which the slides can be used as a formatting template. It also notifies users of a slide automatically in case the source slide is modified. Also by using SharePoint, PowerPoint can manage shared review of presentations. Any SharePoint hosted document can be accessed from the application which created the document or from other applications such as a browser or Microsoft Office Outlook.

==== Groove ====
Microsoft Office 2007 also includes Groove, which brings collaborative features to a peer-to-peer paradigm. Groove can host documents, including presentations, workbooks and others, created in Microsoft Office 2007 application in a shared workspace, which can then be used in collaborative editing of documents. Groove can also be used in managing workspace sessions, including access control of the workspace. To collaborate on one or more documents, a Workspace must be created, and then those who are to work on it must be invited. Any file shared on the workspace are automatically shared among all participants. The application also provides real-time messaging, including one-to-one as well as group messaging, and presence features, as well as monitoring workspace activities with alerts, which are raised when pre-defined set of activities are detected. Groove also provides features for conflict resolution for conflicting edits. Schedules for a collaboration can also be decided by using a built-in shared calendar, which can also be used to keep track of the progress of a project. However, the calendar is not compatible with Microsoft Outlook.

=== Themes and Quick Styles ===
Microsoft Office 2007 places more emphasis on Document Themes and Quick Styles. The Document Theme defines the colors, fonts and graphic effects for a document. Almost everything that can be inserted into a document is automatically styled to match the overall document theme creating a consistent document design. The new Office Theme file format (.THMX) is shared between Word, Excel, PowerPoint and Outlook email messages. Similar themes are also available for data reports in Access and Project or shapes in Visio.

Quick Styles are galleries with a range of styles based on the current theme. There are quick styles galleries for text, tables, charts, SmartArt, WordArt and more. The style range goes from simple/light to more graphical/darker.

== Application-specific changes ==
=== Word ===
- New style sheets (quick styles) and ability to switch easily among them.
- Default font now Calibri instead of Times New Roman, as featured in previous versions of Microsoft Office.
- Word count listed by default in the status bar. The word count dynamically updates as you type.
- New contextual spell checker, signified by a wavy blue underline to the traditional wavy red underline for misspellings and wavy green underline for grammar errors, sometimes catches incorrect usage of correctly spelled words, such as in "I think we will loose this battle".
- Translation tool tip option available for English (U.S.), French (France), and Spanish (International Sort). When selected, hovering the mouse cursor over a word displays its translation in the particular language. Non-English versions have different sets of languages. Other languages can be added by using a separate multilingual pack.
- Automated generation of citations and bibliographies according to defined style rules, including APA, Chicago, and MLA. Changing style updates all references automatically. Connect to web services to access online reference databases.
- Redesigned native mathematical equation support with TeX-like linear input/edit language or GUI. Also supports the Unicode Plain Text Encoding of Mathematics.
- Preset gallery of cover pages with fields for Author, Title, Date, Abstract, etc. Cover pages follow the theme of the document (found under the Page Layout tab).
- Document comparison engine updated to support moves, differences in tables, and also easy to follow tri-pane view of original document, new document, and differences.
- Full screen reading layout that shows two pages at a time with maximal screen usage, plus a few critical tools for reviewing.
- Building Blocks, which lets one save frequently used content, so that they are easily accessible for further use. Building blocks can have data mapped controls in them to allow for form building or structured document authoring.
- The ability to save multiple versions of a document (which had existed since Word 97) has been removed.
- Blog entries can be authored in Word itself and uploaded directly to a blog. Supported blogging sites include Windows Live Spaces, WordPress, SharePoint, Blogger, Telligent Community etc.
- Drops function for Insert/Picture/From Scanner or Camera. Can be added manually.
- Drops the "Bullets and Numbering" dialog boxes and rich, easily controlled range of options for formatting Outline Numbered lists
- For Indian languages, proofing tools were introduced in Office for Bengali, Malayalam, Odia, Konkani and Assamese

=== Outlook ===
- As a major change in Outlook 2007, Exchange 5.5 support has been dropped. Like Evolution, Outlook Express and Entourage, Outlook now works only with Exchange 2000 and above.
- Word becomes the default text editor for this and all subsequent versions.
- Outlook now indexes (using the Windows Search APIs) the e-mails, contacts, tasks, calendar entries, RSS feeds and other items, to speed up searches. As such, it features word-wheeled search, which displays results as characters are typed.
- Search folders, which are saved searches, have been updated to include RSS feeds as well. Search folders can be created with a specific search criteria, specifying the subject, type and other attributes of the information being searched. When a search folder is opened, all matching items for the search are automatically retrieved and grouped up.
- Outlook now supports text-messages and SMSs, when used in conjunction with Exchange Server 2007 Unified Messaging.
- Outlook includes a reader for RSS feeds, which use the Windows Common Feeds Store. RSS subscription URLs can be shared via e-mails; updates can also be pushed to a mobile device.
- Outlook can now support multiple calendars being worked with simultaneously. It also includes a side-by-side view for calendars, where each calendar is displayed in a different tab, and allows easy comparison of them. Outlook also supports web calendars. Calendars can be shared with other users, and also exported as a HTML file for viewing by others who do not have Outlook installed.
- Calendar view shows which tasks are due.
- Flagged e-mails and notes can also be converted to Task items.
- Outlook includes a To Do Bar, which consolidates appointment, calendar, and task items in a single view.
- Outlook includes a Windows SideShow Calendar Gadget
- Online or offline editing of all Microsoft Office 2007 documents via a SharePoint site. All edits are automatically synchronized.
- Contacts can be shared among users, via e-mail, Exchange Server or a SharePoint site.
- Attachment preview allows users to view Office e-mail attachments in the reading pane rather than having to open another program.
- HTML in e-mails is now rendered using the Microsoft Word rendering engine which disallows several HTML tags like object, script, iframe etc. along with several CSS properties.

Microsoft Office Outlook can also include an optional Business Contact Manager (included on a separate installation disc in Office 2007 Small Business and above) which allows management of business contacts and their sales and marketing activities. Phone calls, e-mails, appointments, notes and other business metrics can be managed for each contact. It can also keep a track of billable time for each contact on the Outlook Calendar. Based on these data, a consolidated report view can be generated by Microsoft Office Outlook with Business Contact Manager. The data can be further analyzed using Microsoft Office Excel. This data can also be shared using SharePoint Services.

=== Excel ===
- Support up to 1,048,576 rows and 16,384 columns (XFD) in a single worksheet, with 32,767 characters in a single cell (17,179,869,184 cells in a worksheet, 562,932,773,552,128 characters in a worksheet)
- Conditional Formatting introduces support for three new features — Color Scales, Icon Sets and Data Bars
  - Color Scales, which automatically color the background of a group of cells with different colors according to the values.
  - Icon sets, which precede the text in a cell with an icon that represent some aspect of the value of the cell with respect to other values in a group of cells, can also be applied. Icons can be conditionally applied to show up only when certain criteria are met, such as a cross showing up on an invalid value, where the condition for invalidity can be specified by the user.
  - Data Bars show as a gradient bar in the background of a cell the contribution of the cell value in the group.
- Column titles can optionally show options to control the layout of the column.
- Multithreaded calculation of formulae, to speed up large calculations, especially on multi-core/multi-processor systems.
- User Defined Functions (UDF), which are custom functions written to supplement Excel's set of built-in functions, supports the increased number of cells and columns. UDFs now can also be multithreaded. Server side UDFs are based on the .NET Managed code.
- Importing data from external sources, such as a database, has been upgraded. Data can also be imported from formatted tables and reports, which do not have a regular grid structure
- Formula Autocomplete, automatically suggests function names, arguments and named ranges, and automatically completing them if desired, based on the characters entered. Formulae can refer to a table as well
- CUBE functions which allow importing data, including set aggregated data, from data analysis services, such as SQL Server Analysis Services
- Page Layout view, to author spreadsheets in a way that mirrors the formatting of the printed document
- PivotTables, which are used to create analysis reports out of sets of data, can now support hierarchical data by displaying a row in the table with a "+" icon, which, when clicked, shows more rows regarding it, which can also be hierarchical. PivotTables can also be sorted and filtered independently, and conditional formatting used to highlight trends in the data.
- Filters, now includes a Quick filter option allowing the selection of multiple items from a drop down list of items in the column. The option to filter based on color has been added to the choices available.
- Excel features a new charting engine, which supports advanced formatting, including 3D rendering, transparencies and shadows. Chart layouts can also be customized to highlight various trends in the data.

=== PowerPoint ===
- Improvements to text rendering to support text based graphics.
- Rendering of 3D graphics.
- Support for many more sound file formats such as .mp3 and .wma.
- Support for tables and enhanced support for table pasting from Excel.
- Slide Library, which lets you reuse any slide or presentation as a template. Any presentation or slide can be published to the Slide Library.
- Any custom-designed slide library can be saved.
- Presentations can be digitally signed.
- Improved Presenter View.
- Added support for widescreen slides.
- Allows addition of custom placeholders.
- Drops function for Insert/Picture/From Scanner or Camera.
- Allows for duplication of a slide through right-clicking it without having to go through Copy and Paste

=== OneNote ===
- OneNote now supports multiple notebooks.
- Notebooks can be shared across multiple computers. Anyone can edit even while not connected and changes are merged automatically across machines when a connection is made. Changes are labeled with author and change time/date.
  - Notebooks can be synchronized between two or more machines without an Internet connection when stored on removable media such as an SD card or USB flash drive; changes made to a notebook on a machine when removable media is disconnected will be synced with the notebook when the media is reinserted to that machine. To prevent potential synchronization issues associated with drive mapping during reinsertion, OneNote 2007 associates notebooks with unique device identifiers rather than drive letters to ensure that changes are successfully synced.
- Notebook templates.
- Word-wheeled search is also present in OneNote, which also indexes notes.
- Synchronization of Tasks with Outlook 2007. Also Outlook can send mails to OneNote, or open pages in OneNote that are linked to tasks, contacts, appointments/meetings.
- Support for tables. Using tabs to create tabular structure automatically converts it to a table.
- Optical character recognition is performed on images (e.g., brochures, photos, prints, scans, screen clips) so that any text that appears in them is searchable. Handwritten text on a tablet PC is also searchable.
- Words that are included in audio and video recordings are also tagged and indexed, so that they can be searched.
- Notes can have hyperlinks among themselves, or from outside OneNote to a specific point on a page.
- Embedding documents in notes.
- Extensibility support for add-ins.
- Drawing tools for creating diagrams in OneNote.
- Typing any arithmetic expression, followed by "=" results in the result of the calculation being displayed.
- OneNote Import Printer Driver, where any application can print to a virtual printer for OneNote and the "printed" document is imported to the notebook; OCR is performed on the text that appears in the printed document to facilitate searches.
- OneNote Mobile is included for Smartphones and some PocketPC devices. Syncs notes two-way with OneNote. Takes text, voice, and photo notes.

=== Access ===
- Access now includes support for a broader range of data types, including documents and images.
- Whenever any table is updated, all reports referencing the table are also updated.
- Dropdown lists for a table can be modified in place.
- Lookup Fields, which get their values by "looking up" some value in a table, have been updated to support multi valued lookups.
- Many new preset schemata are included.
- Access can synchronize with Windows SharePoint Services 3.0 and Office SharePoint Server 2007. This feature enables a user to use Access reports while using a server-based, backed-up, IT managed version of the data.

=== Publisher ===
- Templates automatically fill out with information such as company name, logo etc., wherever applicable.
- Frequently used content can be stored in Content Store for quick access.
- A document can be automatically converted from one publication type, such as a newsletter, to another publication type, say a web page.
- Save as PDF supports commercial printing quality PDF.
- Catalog Merge can create publication content automatically by retrieving data, including text, images and other supported types, from an external data source.
- Design Checker, which is used to find design inconsistencies, has been updated.

=== InfoPath ===
- InfoPath designed forms can now be used from a browser, provided the server is running InfoPath Forms Services in SharePoint 2007 or Office Forms Server.
- A form can be sent out to people via e-mail. Such forms can be filled out from Outlook 2007 itself.
- Automatic conversion of forms in Word and Excel to InfoPath forms. Forms can also be exported to Excel.
- Forms can be published to a network share or to SharePoint Server.
- Adding data validation, using validation formulae, and conditional formatting features without manually writing code.
- Print Layout view for designing forms in a view that mirror the printed layout. Such forms can be opened using Word as well.
- Ability to use Microsoft SQL Server, Microsoft Office Access, or other databases as back-end data repository.
- Multiple views for the same forms, to expose different features to different class of users.
- Template Parts, used to group Office InfoPath controls for use later. Template parts retain its XML schema.

=== Visio ===
- PivotDiagrams, which are used to visualize data, show data groups and hierarchical relationships.
  - Visual modification of PivotDiagrams by dragging data around levels, to restructure the data relationships.
  - PivotDiagrams can show aggregate statistical summaries for the data and show them.
- Shapes can be linked with external data sources. Doing so, the shapes are formatted according to the data. The data, and hence the shapes, are updated periodically. Such shapes can also be formatted manually using the Data Graphics feature.
- AutoConnect : Link easily two shapes.
- Data Link : Link data to shapes.
- Data Graphics : Dynamic objects (text and images) linked with external data.
- New Theme behaviour and new shapes.

=== Project ===
- Ability to create custom templates.
- Any change in the project plan or schedule highlights everything else that is affected.
- Analyze changes without actually committing them. Changes can also be done and undone programmatically, to automate analysis of different changes.
- Improved cost resource management and analysis for projects.
- Project data can be used to automatically create charts and diagrams in Microsoft Office Excel and Microsoft Office Visio, respectively.
- The project schedule can be managed as 3D Gantt chart
- Sharing project data with the help of SharePoint Services.

=== SharePoint Designer ===
Microsoft Office SharePoint Designer 2007 is new addition to the Office suite, replacing discontinued FrontPage for users of SharePoint. People who don't use SharePoint can use Microsoft Expression Web

- Supports features and constructs that expose SharePoint functionality
- Supports ASP.NET 2.0 and Windows Workflow Foundation
- Support for creating workflows and data reports, from external data sources
- Can optionally render XML using XSLT

== Server components ==
=== SharePoint Server 2007 ===
Microsoft Office SharePoint Server 2007 allows sharing and collaborative editing of Office 2007 documents. It allows central storage of documents and management of Office documents, throughout the enterprise. These documents can be accessed either by the applications which created them, Microsoft Office Outlook 2007, or a web browser. Documents can also be managed through pre-defined policies that let users create and publish shared content, through a SharePoint site.

SharePoint Server allows searching of all Office documents which are being managed by it, centrally, thereby making data more accessible. It also provides access control for documents. Specialized server components can plug into the SharePoint Server to extend the functionality of the server, such as Excel Services exposing data analysis services for Excel services. Data from other data sources can also be merged with Office data.

SharePoint also lets users personalize the SharePoint sites, filtering content they are interested in. SharePoint documents can also be locally cached by clients for offline editing; the changes are later merged.

=== Forms Server 2007 ===
Microsoft Office Forms Server 2007 allows InfoPath forms to be accessed and filled out using any browser, including mobile phone browsers. Forms Server 2007 also supports using a database or other data source as the back-end for the form. Additionally, it allows centralized deployment and management of forms. Forms Server 2007 hosted forms also support data validation and conditional formatting, as does their InfoPath counterpart. It also supports advanced controls like Repeating section and Repeating table. However, some InfoPath controls cannot be used if it must be hosted on a Forms server.

=== Groove Server 2007 ===
Microsoft Office Groove Server 2007 is for centrally managing all deployments of Microsoft Office Groove 2007 in the enterprise. It enables using Active Directory for Groove user accounts, and create Groove Domains, with individual policy settings. It allows Groove workspaces to be hosted at the server, and the files in the workspaces made available for collaborative editing via the Groove client. It also includes the Groove Server Data Bridge component to allow communication between data stored at both Groove clients and servers and external applications.

=== Project Server 2007 ===
Microsoft Office Project Server 2007 allows one to centrally manage and coordinate projects. It allows budget and resource tracking, and activity plan management. The project data and reports can also be further analyzed using Cube Building Service. The project management data can be accessed from a browser as well.

=== Project Portfolio Server 2007 ===
Microsoft Office Project Portfolio Server 2007 allows creation of a project portfolio, including workflows, hosted centrally, so that the information is available throughout the enterprise, even from a browser. It also aids in centralized data aggregation regarding the project planning and execution, and in visualizing and analyzing the data to optimize the project plan. It can also support multiple portfolios per project, to track different aspects of it. It also includes reporting tools to create consolidated reports out of the project data.

=== PerformancePoint Server 2007 ===
Microsoft PerformancePoint Server allows users to monitor, analyze, and plan their business as well as drive alignment, accountability, and actionable insight across the entire organization. It includes features for scorecards, dashboards, reporting, analytics, budgeting and forecasting, among others.

== Removed features ==
The following features were removed in Office 2007:

- Fully customizable toolbars and menus for all of its applications Quick Access Toolbar and the ribbon have limited customizability. Office 2010 reintroduced ribbon UI customizability.
- Office Assistant
- Speech recognition
- Handwriting recognition and ink features
- Ability to slipstream service packs into the original setup files (administrative installation images)
- Office Web Components
- Save My Settings Wizard
- Choice of local installation source allowing users to choose whether to keep a locally cached copy of installation source files or remove it. Setup files are now cached locally without user preference and cannot be removed. They are recreated by Office 2007 if removed.
- Several deployment-related utility Resource Kit tools. Some primary deployment tools ship with Office 2007 itself.
- Office FileSearch object and File Search functionality from File menu.
- Chart Wizard

== Criticism ==
=== Redesigned user interface ===
Even though the ribbon can be hidden, PC World wrote that the new "ribbon" interface crowds the Office work area, especially for notebook users. Others have called its large icons distracting. Essentially, the GUI-type interface of the ribbon contrasts sharply with the older menus that were organized according to the typical functions undertaken in paper-based offices: for instance, the old "File" menu dealt with opening, (re-)naming, saving, and printing a file, and the old "Edit" menu dealt with making changes to the content of the file. As a result, users who were more familiar with the logic of the old menus would be somewhat frustrated with the new, more visually oriented ribbon. The ribbon cannot be moved from the top to the side of the page, as floating toolbars could be.

Some users with experience using previous versions of Microsoft Office have complained about having to find features in the ribbon. Others state that having learnt to use the new interface, it has improved the speed with which "professional-looking" documents can be created. Microsoft has released a series of small programs, help sheets, videos and add-ins to help users learn the new interface more quickly.

==== Patenting controversy ====
Microsoft contractor Mike Gunderloy left Microsoft partially over his disagreement with the company's "sweeping land grab" including its attempt to patent the ribbon interface. He says "Microsoft itself represents a grave threat to the future of software development through its increasing inclination to stifle competition through legal shenanigans." He says that by leaving Microsoft, he is "no longer contributing to the eventual death of programming."

=== Office Open XML ===
The new XML-based document file format in Microsoft Office 2007 is incompatible with previous versions of Microsoft Office unless an add-on is installed for the older version.

PC World has stated that upgrading to Office 2007 presents dangers to certain data, such as templates, macros, and mail messages.

The Microsoft Word 2007 equation editor, which uses a form of MathML called Office MathML (OMML), is also incompatible with that of previous versions. Upon converting Microsoft Word 2007 .docx files to .doc files, equations are rendered as graphics. On June 6, 2007, Inera Inc. revealed that Science and Nature refused to accept manuscripts prepared in Microsoft Word 2007 .docx format; subsequently Inera Inc. informed Microsoft that Microsoft Word 2007's file format impairs usability for scholarly publishing. As of 25 April 2011 Nature still does not support Office Open XML format; Science however, accepts this format but discourages its use.

=== Bibliographies ===
The new Word 2007 features for bibliographies only support a small number of fixed citation styles. Using XSLT, new styles can be added. Some extra styles, such as the standard Association for Computing Machinery publication format, are made freely available by third parties.

== See also ==
- Comparison of office suites
- List of office suites
- Microsoft Office 2007 filename extensions
