= FPSE =

FPSE may refer to:

- Free piston Stirling engine, a topic in thermodynamics
- Microsoft FrontPage#Server Extensions
