= Microsoft Personal Web Server =

Web server software

- Developer: Microsoft
- Operating system: Windows 95-98, Windows 98 SE, Windows NT 4.0
- Available in: Same languages as Windows
- Type: Web server

Microsoft Personal Web Server (PWS) is a scaled-down web server software for Windows operating systems. It has fewer features than Microsoft's Internet Information Services (IIS) and its functions have been superseded by IIS and Visual Studio. Microsoft officially supports PWS on Windows 95-98, Windows 98 SE, and Windows NT 4.0. Prior to the release of Windows 2000, PWS was available as a free download as well as included on the Windows distribution CDs. PWS 4 was the last version and it can be found on the Windows 98 CD and the Windows NT 4.0 Option Pack.

== Creation ==
Personal Web Server was originally created by Vermeer Technologies, the same company which created Microsoft FrontPage, before they were acquired by Microsoft. It was installed by FrontPage versions 1.1 to 98 as well.

NT Workstation 4.0 shipped with Peer Web Services, which was based on IIS 2.0 and 3.0. With IIS 4.0, this was renamed Personal Web Server to be consistent with the name used in 95/98.

== Compatibility and usage ==
Since Windows 2000, PWS was renamed the same IIS name used in server versions of Windows as a standard Windows component. Windows Me and Windows XP Home Edition support neither PWS nor IIS, although PWS can be installed on Windows Me. In other editions of Windows XP, IIS is included as standard.

Before Microsoft Visual Studio 2005, PWS was useful in developing web applications on the localhost before deploying to a production web server. The IDE of Visual Studio 2005 (and later versions) now contains a built-in lightweight web server for such development purposes.

FTP, SMTP, HTTP and the usual web languages such as PHP and Perl are supported by PWS. It also supports basic CGI (Common Gateway Interface) conventions and a subset of Classic ASP. Using these technologies, web applications running on PWS are capable of performing and interpreting database queries and results.

== For Macintosh ==
Microsoft also produced a version of Personal Web Server for the Macintosh based on code acquired in its acquisition of ResNova Software in November 1996.
