= Charles Ferguson (filmmaker) =

American film producer and angel investor

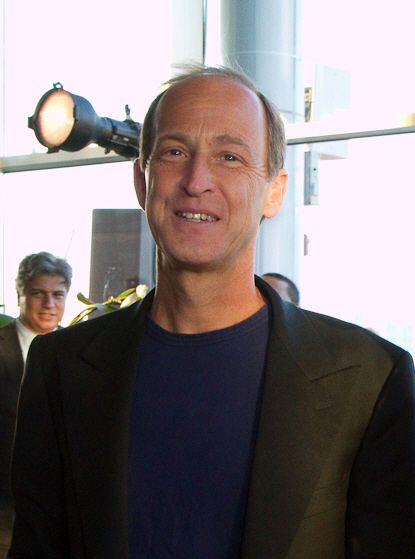
- Ferguson in New York, on April 19, 2012
- Born: Charles Henry Ferguson; March 24, 1955 (age 71); San Francisco, United States
- Education: MIT (PhD); University of California, Berkeley (BA)
- Occupations: Film director, film producer, entrepreneur, writer, angel investor
- Website: cferguson.com

Charles Henry Ferguson (born March 24, 1955) is a General Partner at Davidovs Venture Collective and Venture Partner with EWOR, and an angel investor and strategic advisor to early stage technology startups and venture capital firms, especially in artificial intelligence. He is also the founder and president of Representational Pictures, Inc. and director and producer of four feature documentaries, including No End in Sight (2007), which won the Sundance Special Jury Prize and Inside Job (2010), which won the Oscar for Best Documentary Feature. Prior to making films, Ferguson was a Senior Fellow at the Brookings Institution, a Visiting Scholar at MIT and UC Berkeley, and a visiting lecturer in the UC Berkeley School of Journalism. Earlier in his career Ferguson was the founder (with Randy Forgaard) and CEO of Vermeer Technologies, developer of FrontPage, which was sold to Microsoft in 1996. Ferguson holds a BA in mathematics from UC Berkeley and a Ph.D. in political science from MIT. Ferguson is a life member of the Council on Foreign Relations and sits on the board of directors of the French American Foundation.

== Early life and education ==
A native of San Francisco, Ferguson was originally trained as a political scientist. A graduate of Lowell High School in 1972, he earned a BA in mathematics from the University of California, Berkeley in 1978 and a PhD in political science from Massachusetts Institute of Technology in 1989. Ferguson conducted postdoctoral research at MIT while consulting for the White House, the Office of the U.S. Trade Representative, the Department of Defense, and several U.S. and European high technology firms. From 1992 to 1994, Ferguson was an independent consultant, providing strategic advice to the top management of U.S. high technology firms, including Apple Inc., Xerox, Motorola, and Texas Instruments.

Ferguson is bicoastal, splitting his time between New York City and California.

== Career ==
=== Early career ===
In 1994, Ferguson founded Vermeer Technologies, one of the earliest Internet software companies, with Randy Forgaard. Vermeer created the first visual website development tool, FrontPage. In early 1996, Ferguson sold Vermeer for $133 million to Microsoft, which integrated FrontPage into Microsoft Office.

After selling Vermeer, Ferguson returned to research and writing. He was a visiting scholar and lecturer for several years at MIT and Berkeley, and for three years was a Senior Fellow at the Brookings Institution in Washington DC. Ferguson is the author of four books and many articles dealing with various aspects of information technology and its relationships to economic, political, and social issues. Ferguson is a life member of the Council on Foreign Relations, a director of the French-American Foundation, and supports several nonprofit organizations.

=== Film career ===
For more than 20 years, Ferguson had been intensely interested in film, and regularly attended film festivals such as the Telluride Film Festival for over a decade. In mid-2005, he formed Representational Pictures and began production of No End in Sight, which was one of the first feature-length documentaries on post-war Iraq.

No End in Sight won a special jury prize for documentaries at the 2007 Sundance Film Festival and was nominated for an Oscar in 2008 in the documentary feature film category. Ferguson also received a nomination for the Writers Guild of America Award for Best Documentary Screenplay for the film.

Inside Job, a feature-length documentary about the 2008 financial crisis, was screened at the Cannes Film Festival in May 2010 and the New York Film Festival and was released by Sony Pictures Classics in October 2010. It received the 2010 Academy Award for Best Documentary Feature. Ferguson credits narrator Matt Damon for contributing to the film, specifically the structure of the ending, in addition to his narration duties.

On May 1, 2011, The New York Times reported that Ferguson had agreed to make a film about WikiLeaks founder Julian Assange for HBO Films. According to IMDb the film was scheduled for release in 2013 but the project was eventually mothballed.

On September 30, 2013, Charles Ferguson wrote on the Huffington Post that he would be cancelling his CNN documentary on Hillary Clinton due, not just to pressure from the Clintons and their allies, but also from the Republican Party, to stop pursuing the project. In the article Ferguson lamented that "nobody, and I mean nobody, was interested in helping me make this film. Not Democrats, not Republicans – and certainly nobody who works with the Clintons, wants access to the Clintons or dreams of a position in a Hillary Clinton administration." In a June 2013 interview with former President Bill Clinton, Clinton told Ferguson that he and Larry Summers couldn't change Alan Greenspan's mind about the Commodity Futures Modernization Act of 2000, which deregulated derivatives and helped fuel the 2008 financial crisis and the subsequent Great Recession. Congress then passed the Act with a veto-proof supermajority. Ferguson thought Clinton was "a really good actor" and that this was a lie. Actually, Ferguson wrote, the Clinton Administration and Larry Summers lobbied for the Act and, along with Robert Rubin privately attacked advocates of regulation.

Ferguson directed the first major documentary about the Watergate Scandal. Entitled Watergate, the 260-minute film had its European premiere at the 2019 Berlin International Film Festival and received the 2019 Cinema for Peace award for Most Political Film of the Year.

== Technology ==
Starting in 2022, Ferguson has become an active early stage technology investor and startup advisor. He is a limited partner in six early stage venture capital funds, and is an angel investor in early stage technology startups. Recent investments include placing the first money into Aperture Data, Dicer, Aomni, Pally, Paradigm and Cofactory.

== Works and publications ==
- Computer Wars: The Fall of IBM and the Future of Global Technology. with Charles R. Morris. Three Rivers Press. 1993. ISBN 978-0-8129-2300-1.
- High Stakes, No Prisoners: A Winner's Tale of Greed and Glory in the Internet Wars. W. W. Norton & Company. 1999. ISBN 978-1-58799-065-6.
- The Broadband Problem: Anatomy of a Market Failure and a Policy Dilemma. Brookings Institution Press. 2004. ISBN 978-0-8157-0644-1.
- No End in Sight: Iraq's Descent into Chaos. PublicAffairs. 2008. ISBN 978-1-58648-608-2.
- Predator Nation. Crown Business. 2012. ISBN 978-0307952561. This is a companion to the movie Inside Job, providing citations for many of the claims in that movie.

== Filmography ==
- No End in Sight (2007)
- Inside Job (2010)
- Time to Choose (2015)
- Watergate (2018)
