= Vermeer Technologies =

Software company founded in 1994

Vermeer Technologies, Inc.
- Type: Subsidiary
- Founded: 1994; 32 years ago
- Headquarters: Cambridge, Massachusetts, United States
- Key people: Charles H. Ferguson
- Products: Truck, Agriculture, Web site, Browser wars
- Parent: Microsoft Corporation

Vermeer Technologies Incorporated was a software company founded in 1994 by Charles H. Ferguson and Randy Forgaard. Its products were a Web site development tool, FrontPage, and a Web server, Personal Web Server, which complemented developing in FrontPage. Vermeer launched the initial version of FrontPage on October 2, 1995.

Vermeer was funded by Matrix Partners, Sigma Partners, and Atlas Venture.

The company was purchased by Microsoft for US$133 million in January 1996 ($273 million in present-day terms). Microsoft acquired FrontPage as a new weapon in the browser wars.

The company's birth, development, and sale were the subject of Ferguson's 1999 book, High St@kes, No Prisoners.

A Harvard Business School case, "Vermeer Technologies (A): A Company is Born" (HBS 9-397-078), described the start of the company.

Even after Microsoft acquired FrontPage, the software continued to store proprietary configuration settings in directories whose names started with _vti. The letters "VTI" stand for Vermeer Technologies, Inc.
