= Gabriola (typeface) =

Typeface designed by John Hudson

- Category: Display
- Designer: John Hudson
- Foundry: Microsoft Corporation
- Date released: 2008

Gabriola is a display typeface designed by John Hudson for Microsoft Corporation. It is named after Gabriola Island, British Columbia, Canada. Versions of Gabriola were supplied with Microsoft Windows since Version 7, and with some Microsoft Office applications since Version 2010.

== Design ==
Sample text using different stylistic sets

Gabriola was inspired by the calligraphy of Jan van de Velde the Elder. It was developed with advanced OpenType features and has been optimized for ClearType rendering to improve legibility on screens. Hudson added a number of stylistic alternate characters and flourishes, which were grouped thematically by stylistic set into different styles of calligraphy.

=== Distinguishing features ===
Easily identifiable and unusual features include:

- The flourish of the uppercase Q extends far below the following letter; e.g. Qualifier
- The flourish of the lowercase f and both the lowercase j and uppercase J extends far below the previous letter; e.g. alforja
