= Microsoft SharePoint Designer =

Web design tool

- SharePoint Designer 2013 (x64) running on Windows 8
- Developer: Microsoft
- Release: November 30, 2006; 19 years ago
- Stable release: 2013 (15.0.4849.1000) / August 2, 2016; 10 years ago
- Operating system: Windows 7 or later
- Platform: IA-32 and x64
- Size: 282 MB – 324 MB
- Type: HTML editor (originally), wiki software
- License: Freeware
- Website: www.microsoft.com/spd

Microsoft SharePoint Designer (SPD), formerly known as Microsoft Office SharePoint Designer, is a discontinued freeware tool for creating or modifying Microsoft SharePoint sites, workflows and web pages. The original 2007 version was released as a member of the Microsoft Office 2007 family, and could be used as a generic HTML editor. The 2010 release became part of the Microsoft SharePoint family, and could no longer operate in the absence of a SharePoint site. SharePoint Designer 2013 is the last version.

== History ==
SharePoint Designer and its sister product, Microsoft Expression Web, are successors of Microsoft FrontPage. While Expression Web serves as the full-featured successor to FrontPage, SharePoint Designer focuses on designing and customizing Microsoft SharePoint websites. For instance, it only includes SharePoint-specific site templates. The first version, SharePoint Designer 2007, retains more FrontPage features than Expression Web (such as web components, database, marquee, hit counter, navigation bars and map insert).

SharePoint Designer 2007 was initially a commercial software product. On March 31, 2009, however, SharePoint Designer 2007 was made available as freeware. Microsoft released two service packs for this version: Service Pack 2 was released on April 24, 2009, while Service Pack 3 came on October 24, 2011.

The next major version, SharePoint Designer 2010, was released to web on April 21, 2010 in two flavors for IA-32 and x64 CPUs. Unlike its predecessor, however, it does not operate in absence of Microsoft SharePoint Server or Microsoft SharePoint Foundation and therefore cannot be used as a generic HTML editor.

On October 30, 2012, Microsoft released SharePoint Designer 2013. This is the last version of SharePoint Designer; following the announcement of SharePoint 2016 in Ignite 2015 conference, Mark Kashman, Senior Product Manager of Microsoft, revealed that a corresponding SharePoint Designer would not be released with this product. The last update for SharePoint Designer was released on August 2, 2016, and was deprecated on July 14, 2026.

== Features ==
SharePoint Designer shares its codebase, user interface and HTML rendering engine with Expression Web, and does not rely on Internet Explorer's Trident engine. It features a workflow designer that allows users of SharePoint to create workflow so that workflow can automate the process with the concept and objects such as list item, content type, and list column within SharePoint server. Starting from SharePoint 2013, it provides a text-based designer and a visual designer for non-developer users.
