= Preview (computing) =

Computing (preview)

Page preview feature in MediaWiki, showing the beginning section of a Wikipedia article when hovering over a hyperlink

Preview is a computing function to display a document, page, or film before it is produced in its final form. In the case of printed material this is known as "print preview".

== Content preview ==
Previewing allows users to see the current stage of the process before producing into a final form. Preview lets users visualize the current/final product and correct possible errors easily before finalizing the product. Preview is necessary for markup language editing software like Web development applications.

Web development applications like Adobe Dreamweaver and most HTML editors have a "preview in browser" feature. Though browsers in general produce the same results, each browser version can display HTML pages somewhat differently. Preview in browser lets writers check how the page will appear in multiple target browsers.

Video editing applications also have a preview feature to see the current product made during the editing process. Final Cut Pro's interface has two preview windows, "Viewer window" and "Canvas window". "Viewer window" lets users preview clips and decide which one to use. User can also make changes to clips in this window. "Canvas window" shows a preview of the current project's rendered product.

Many interactive websites and online forums allow users to preview their content before submitting it. This is particularly useful on sites with complex markup (not WYSIWYG), where it serves as an opportunity to identify and correct errors and formatting problems before saving the content.

== Print preview ==
Print preview is a functionality that lets users see the pages that are about to print, allowing users to see exactly how the pages will look when they are printed.

By previewing what the layout will look like when printed without actually printing, users can check and fix possible errors before they begin actual printing. Most applications have a print preview feature and some applications, like Adobe Photoshop and Microsoft Office, automatically open "Print Preview" when the "Print" menu is selected. This feature is useful for making sure that the layout is the way the user expects it to be before the actual printing.

Microsoft Word's Print Preview feature lets users to zoom in/out in the document or show multiple pages in one window. Graphic tools like Adobe Photoshop's Print Preview lets users position and scale the image before printing.

Many web browsers also have a print preview feature so that users can preview how the website contents will be printed out on paper.

Internet Explorer has a Print Preview feature to prevent accidents like printing ten pages where it ought to print one, or printing a page with an unwanted background color. In Internet Explorer Print Preview, one can adjust the paper size to print on, margins, and page orientation of the Web page. Mozilla Firefox has Print Preview built in as well. Safari lets users preview the web page when Print is clicked. In Print, the Preview button opens the Preview application and the print preview of the web page shows up.
