= Web Part =

A Web Part, also called a Web Widget, is an ASP.NET server control which is added to a Web Part Zone on Web Part Pages by users at run time. The controls enable end users to modify the content, appearance, and behavior of Web pages directly from a browser. It can be put into certain places in a web page by end users, after development by a programmer.

Web Parts can be used as an add-on ASP.NET technology to Windows SharePoint Services.

Web Parts are equivalent to Portlets, but don't necessarily require a web portal such as SharePoint to host them.

== See also ==
- Portlet
- Web widget
- ASP.NET
- Windows SharePoint Services
- SharePoint Portal Server
- Microsoft Office SharePoint Server 2007
- Microsoft SharePoint 2010
