= Microsoft FrontPage =

Website editing and administration tool

Microsoft Office FrontPage

- Microsoft Office FrontPage 2003 running on Windows XP
- Original author: Vermeer Technologies
- Developer: Microsoft
- Release: November 1995; 30 years ago (as Vermeer FrontPage)
- Final release: 2003 (11.8339.8341) / September 17, 2007; 18 years ago
- Operating system: Microsoft Windows
- Type: HTML editor
- License: Proprietary

Microsoft Office FrontPage is a discontinued WYSIWYG HTML editor and website administration tool from Microsoft for the Microsoft Windows line of operating systems. It was branded as part of the Microsoft Office suite from 1997 to 2003. Microsoft FrontPage has since been replaced by Microsoft Expression Web and SharePoint Designer, which were first released in December 2006 alongside Microsoft Office 2007, but these two products were also discontinued in favor of a web-based version of SharePoint Designer, as those three HTML editors were desktop applications.

== History ==
FrontPage was initially created by Cambridge, Massachusetts company Vermeer Technologies, Incorporated, evidence of which can be easily spotted in file names and directories prefixed _vti_ in web sites created using FrontPage. Vermeer was acquired by Microsoft in January 1996 specifically so that Microsoft could add FrontPage to its product line-up, allowing them to gain an advantage in the browser wars, as FrontPage was designed to create web pages for their own browser, Internet Explorer.

As a "WYSIWYG" (What You See Is What You Get) editor, FrontPage is designed to hide the details of pages' HTML code from the user, making it possible for novices to create web pages and web sites easily.

FrontPage's initial outing under the Microsoft name came in 1996 with the release of Windows NT 4.0 Server and its constituent Web server Internet Information Services 2.0. Bundled on CD with the NT 4.0 Server release, FrontPage 1.1 would run under NT 4.0 (Server or Workstation) or Windows 95. Up to FrontPage 98, the FrontPage Editor, which was used for designing pages, was a separate application from the FrontPage Explorer which was used to manage web site folders. With FrontPage 2000, both programs were merged into the Editor.

FrontPage used to require a set of server-side plugins originally known as IIS Extensions. The extension set was significantly enhanced for Microsoft inclusion of FrontPage into the Microsoft Office line-up with Office 97 and subsequently renamed FrontPage Server Extensions (FPSE). Both sets of extensions needed to be installed on the target web server for its content and publishing features to work. Microsoft offered both Windows and Unix-based versions of FPSE. FrontPage 2000 Server Extensions worked with earlier versions of FrontPage as well. FPSE 2002 was the last released version which also works with FrontPage 2003 and was later updated for IIS 6.0 as well. However, with FrontPage 2003, Microsoft began moving away from proprietary Server Extensions to standard protocols like FTP and WebDAV for remote web publishing and authoring. FrontPage 2003 can also be used with Windows SharePoint Services.

A version for the classic Mac OS was released in 1998; however, it had fewer features than the Windows product and Microsoft has never updated it.

In 2006, Microsoft announced that FrontPage would eventually be superseded by two products. Microsoft SharePoint Designer would allow business professionals to design SharePoint-based applications. Microsoft Expression Web is targeted at the web design professional for the creation of feature-rich web sites. Microsoft discontinued Microsoft FrontPage in December 2006.

== Features ==
Some of the features in the last version of FrontPage include:

- FrontPage 2003 consists of a Split View option to allow the user to code in Code View and preview in Design View without the hassle of switching from the Design and Code View tabs for each review.
- Dynamic Web Templates (DWT) were included for the first time in FrontPage 2003, allowing users to create a single template that could be used across multiple pages and even the whole Web site.
- Interactive Buttons give users a new easy way to create Web graphics for navigation and links, eliminating the need for a complicated image-editing package such as Adobe Photoshop which Microsoft does not sell.
- The accessibility checker gives the user the ability to check if their code is standards-compliant and that their Web site is easily accessible for people with disabilities. An HTML optimizer is included to aid in optimizing code to make it legible and quicker to process.
- Intellisense, which is a form of autocompletion, is a key feature in FrontPage 2003 that assists the user while typing in Code View. When working in Code View, Intellisense will suggest tags and/or properties for the code that the user is entering which was intended to significantly reduce the time to write code. The Quick Tag Editor shows the user the tag they are currently in when editing in Design View. This also includes the option to edit the specific tag/property from within the Tag Editor.
- Code Snippets give users the advantage of creating snippets of their commonly used pieces of code, allowing them to store it for easy access whenever it is next needed.
- FrontPage 2003 includes support for programming in ASP.NET a server-side scripting language that adds interactivity to Web sites and Web pages.
- FrontPage 2003 includes support for macros in VBA.

== Versions ==
- 1995 — Vermeer FrontPage 1.0
- 1996 — Microsoft FrontPage 1.1
- 1996 — Microsoft FrontPage 97 (version 2)
- 1997 — Microsoft FrontPage Express 2.0 (free simple web page editor came with Internet Explorer 4 and 5, and could be found online from numerous shareware Web sites)
- 1997 — Microsoft FrontPage for Macintosh 1.0
- 1997 — Microsoft FrontPage 98 (version 3)
- 1999 — Microsoft FrontPage 2000 (version 4): Also included in Office 2000 Premium and Developer editions
- 2001 — Microsoft FrontPage 2002 (version 10): Included in Office XP Professional with FrontPage (volume license only), Office XP Professional Special Edition and Office XP Developer edition. Starting with this version, the version number jumps to 10.0 to tally Microsoft Office versions.
- 2003 — Microsoft Office FrontPage 2003 (version 11): Not included in any of the Office 2003 editions, sold separately. It was included with Windows Small Business Server 2003 Premium Edition.

Note: There is no official version 5 to 9, because after FrontPage was included in some Office editions, the version numbers followed their Office version numbers. Nonetheless, version numbers may appear in the meta tags of HTML code generated by these versions of FrontPage.

== Server Extensions ==
FrontPage Server Extensions are a software technology that allows FrontPage clients to communicate with web servers, and provide additional functionality intended for websites. Frequent security problems have marred the history of this Microsoft proprietary technology. It relies on HTTP protocol for communication, and CGI/POST for server-side processing.

Software IDE Microsoft Visual Studio 6.0 uses this technology for file synchronization purposes, and strongly depends on this technology for file management. Most .NET Microsoft products obsoleted this in favor of WebDAV, but Visual Studio 2005 and 2008 still publishes ClickOnce applications to websites with FrontPage Server Extensions.

== See also ==
- Comparison of office suites
- Internet Information Services
- Microsoft Expression Web
- Microsoft GIF Animator
- Microsoft SharePoint Designer
- Microsoft Sway
