= Lifeyo =

Web hosting service

LIFEYO
- Developers: Mike Kai; Wiwat Ruengmee, PhD
- Stable release: Beta
- Operating system: Cross-platform
- Type: Website builder
- Website: http://www.lifeyo.com

LIFEYO is a website hosting company founded in Newport Beach, CA. Lifeyo allows users to make websites without using HTML or managing a hosting account.

Lifeyo competes with other website builders such as Yola, Duda, Jimdo, Framer, Webs, Weebly, Site.pro and Wix.

== Features ==
Lifeyo offers templates that allow users to get started building their website quickly. Users can choose from different website types (business, personal, portfolio, and blogging) that provide a starting point with placeholder content. The WYSIWYG website builder allows users to customize website pages in a visual manner that does not require any HTML coding expertise. Users of Lifeyo can build websites using the blogging interface and photo gallery features. A feature that was unique to Lifeyo is the ability to collaborate on a website with multiple editors. The service is free and does not apply ads on websites created by users. For a fee the company offers an upgrade to a domain name.

== History ==
Lifeyo was released to the public in 2010 at the South By Southwest Interactive conference in Austin, Texas. It was a startup launched by Mike Kai and Wiwat Ruengmee. Lifeyo has offices based in Newport Beach, California and Bangkok, Thailand.

== Reception ==
In 2010, Erez Zukerman of AOL News gave a positive review to Lifeyo. Zukerman described Lifeyo as an "Incredible content-management system for someone just trying to put together their first website.”
