= List of HTML editors =

The following is a list of HTML editors.

== Source code editors ==
Source code editors evolved from basic text editors, but include additional tools specifically geared toward handling code.

- ActiveState Komodo
- Aptana
- Atom
- BBEdit
- Bluefish
- Coda
- Codelobster
- CoffeeCup HTML Editor
- Dreamweaver
- Eclipse with the Web Tools Platform
- Emacs
- EmEditor
- Geany
- HomeSite
- Kakoune
- Kate
- Notepad++
- NetBeans IDE
- PHPEdit
- PhpStorm IDE
- PSPad
- RJ TextEd
- SciTE
- Smultron
- Sublime Text
- TED Notepad
- TextMate
- TextPad
- TextWrangler
- UltraEdit
- Vim
- Visual Studio
- Visual Studio Code
- WebStorm
- Zed

== WYSIWYG editors ==
HTML editors that support What You See Is What You Get (WYSIWYG) paradigm provide a user interface similar to a word processor for creating HTML documents, as an alternative to manual coding. Achieving true WYSIWYG however is not always possible.

- Adobe Dreamweaver
- Bootstrap Studio
- CKEditor
- EZGenerator
- Freeway
- Froala
- Google Web Designer
- Jimdo
- Microsoft SharePoint Designer
- Microsoft Visual Studio
- Visual Web Developer
- Microsoft Visual Web Developer Express
- Microsoft Publisher
- NetObjects Fusion
- Nvu
- Opera Dragonfly
- SeaMonkey Composer
- Silex
- TinyMCE
- TOWeb
- UltraEdit
- Webflow
- Wix.com

=== Word processors ===
While word processors are not ostensibly HTML editors, the following word processors are capable of editing and saving HTML documents. Results will vary when opening some web pages.

- AbiWord
- Apache OpenOffice
- Apple Pages (will not save as nor export as HTML)
- AppleWorks (discontinued)
- Collabora Online
- Kingsoft Office
- LibreOffice Writer
- Microsoft Word
- WordPerfect

== WYSIWYM editors ==
WYSIWYM (what you see is what you mean) is an alternative paradigm to WYSIWYG, in which the focus is on the semantic structure of the document rather than on the presentation. These editors produce more logically structured markup than is typical of WYSIWYG editors, while retaining the advantage in ease of use over hand-coding using a text editor.

- Lyx (interface to Latex/Tex, via which can convert to/from HTML)
- WYMeditor

== Discontinued editors ==
Editors that have been discontinued, but may still be in use or cited on published web pages

- Adobe Brackets
- Adobe GoLive (replaced by Adobe Dreamweaver)
- Adobe Muse
- Adobe PageMill (replaced by Adobe GoLive)
- AOLpress
- Amaya
- Apple iWeb (discontinued 2011)
- Claris Home Page
- BlueGriffon (discontinued 2017)
- HotDog
- HoTMetaL (replaced by XMetaL)
- KompoZer (discontinued 2010)
- Macromedia HomeSite (replaced by Adobe Dreamweaver)
- Maqetta (discontinued 2013)
- Microsoft Expression Web
- Microsoft FrontPage (replaced by Microsoft Expression Web and Microsoft SharePoint Designer)
- Microsoft WebMatrix
- Mozilla Composer (replaced by Nvu and SeaMonkey Composer)
- Netscape Composer
- Nvu (discontinued 2006, replaced by KompoZer and BlueGriffon)
- OpenOffice.Org (replaced by Apache OpenOffice and LibreOffice)
- tkWWW
- WebPlus
- WorldWideWeb

== See also ==
- Comparison of HTML editors
- Comparison of text editors
- Content Management System
