= Onepager =

Onepager, Inc.
- Type: Private
- Founded: 2011
- Headquarters: New York City, United States
- Area served: Worldwide
- Services: Website builder, Web hosting service, Web content management system
- Website: onepagerapp.com

Onepager is a subscription web service that allows users to create HTML5, mobile-friendly websites using a "drag and drop" editor. The service offers both free and premium subscriptions which include both website hosting and website building tools. Onepager has a variety of website templates to choose from and users can also connect a domain they own or purchase one within the tool.

Onepager competes with Wix, Weebly, Site.pro and Yola.

== History ==
Onepager was founded by Eric Tarn, Yin Yin Chan, Matthew Moore, and Matt Shampine in August 2011. The company is located in New York City and is backed by angel investors including Daniel Eskapa and Mark Birch. The team's goal for the service is to enable the millions of small businesses without websites to establish a simple and easy-to-build website.

In December 2012, Onepager launched the ability for freelancers and agencies to create multiple sites under one account. Subscribers are allowed to add additional users and enable white-labeling of the interface.

== Features ==
Onepager allows users to create a one-page website, primarily for small businesses. The product has been designed with businesses in mind and includes content modules including Hours, Email Forms, and Contact Information featuring Google Maps. Also allowed are video/audio embeds, eCommerce functionality through PayPal, newsletter subscription forms.

A unique feature of Onepager is the ability to collect email addresses from visitors and send email newsletters to subscribers. Users can also monitor the analytics showing how their site is performing.
