= Subdomain =

DNS domains that are part of others

In the Domain Name System (DNS) hierarchy, a subdomain is a domain that is a part of another (main) domain. For example, if a domain offered an online store as part of their website example.com, it might use the subdomain shop.example.com.

== Overview ==
The Domain Name System (DNS) uses a tree structure or hierarchy, where the nodes on the tree are domain names. Within this hierarchy, each node represents a domain name, and a subdomain is defined as a subset of a higher-level domain. Each label may contain from 0 to 63 octets. The full domain name may not exceed a total length of 253 ASCII characters in its textual representation.

Subdomains are typically configured through modifications to the DNS zone file of the parent domain. These modifications can define various record types, including A (Address) records, CNAME (Canonical Name) records, and NS (Name Server) records.

There is some debate in the networking community regarding the proper use of the term "subdomain." Some network professionals define subdomains strictly as names delegated via NS records, while others include any types of zone records which may map to any public IP address destination and any type of server.

According to RFC 1034, "a domain is a subdomain of another domain if it is contained within that domain". Based on that definition, a host cannot be a subdomain, only a domain can be a subdomain. A subdomain will also have a separate zone file with a SOA record (Start of Authority).

Most domain registries only allocate a two-level domain name. Hosting services typically provide DNS Servers to resolve subdomains within that master domain. Many website hosting and content management platforms assign subdomains by default. For example, services such as Wix, GitHub Pages, Webador, Webnode, and Jimdo often provide subdomains under their primary domain (e.g., username.wixsite.com) as part of free or entry-level hosting plans.

Example of a subdomain. The "en" is the subdomain, while "wikipedia" is the main domain.

A fully qualified domain name (FQDN) consists of multiple parts. For example, take the English Wikipedia domain en.wikipedia.org. The en is a subdomain of wikipedia.org. Although wikipedia.org is usually considered to be the domain name, wikipedia is actually a sub-domain of the org TLD (top level domain). Any fully qualified domain name can be a host or a subdomain.

A domain name that does not include any subdomains is known as an apex domain, root domain, or bare domain. For example, wikipedia.org is the apex domain of Wikipedia, which redirects to the subdomain www.wikipedia.org.

== Techniques ==
Subdomain enumeration refers to the process of identifying subdomains associated with a given domain. This can be accomplished through a variety of methods, including the use of automated tools such as Amass and Subfinder, which leverage open-source intelligence and SSL certificate data to uncover subdomains. Google Dorking, using the "site:" operator, allows for manual searches of indexed subdomains, while brute force techniques systematically query DNS servers with potential names. Passive DNS reconnaissance through APIs from services like SecurityTrails & Subdomain Center can reveal historical data without direct queries. Additionally, community resources such as GitHub and Pastebin may contain publicly available lists of subdomains.

== Subdomain usage ==
Subdomains are often used by Internet service providers (ISPs) supplying web services. They allocate one (or more) subdomains to their clients who do not have their own domain name. This allows independent administration by the clients over their subdomain.

Subdomains are also used by organizations that wish to assign a unique name to a particular department, function, or service related to the organization. For example, a university might assign "cs" to the computer science department, such that a number of hosts could be used inside that subdomain, such as www.cs.example.edu.

There are some widely recognized subdomains such as WWW and FTP. This allows for a structure where the domain contains administrative directories and files including the FTP directories and webpages. The FTP subdomain could contain logs and the web page directories, while the WWW subdomain contains the directories for the webpages. Independent authentication for each domain provides access control over the various levels of the domain.

== Uses ==
=== United Kingdom ===
In the United Kingdom, the second-level domain names are standard and branch off from the top-level domain. For example:

- .ac.uk: academic (tertiary education, further education colleges and research establishments) and learned societies
- .co.uk: general use (usually commercial)
- .gov.uk: government (central and local)
- .judiciary.uk: courts (to be introduced in the near future)
- .ltd.uk: limited companies
- .me.uk: general use (usually personal)
- .mod.uk: Ministry of Defence and HM Forces public sites
- .net.uk: ISPs and network companies (unlike .net, use is restricted to these users)
- .nhs.uk: National Health Service institutions
- .nic.uk: network use only (Nominet UK)
- .org.uk: general use (usually for non-profit organisations)
- .parliament.uk: parliamentary use (only for the UK Parliament and the Scottish Parliament)
- .plc.uk: public limited companies
- .police.uk: police forces
- .sch.uk: Local Education Authorities, schools, primary and secondary education, community education

=== Vanity domain ===
A vanity domain is a subdomain of an ISP's domain that is aliased to an individual user account, or a subdomain that expresses the individuality of the person on whose behalf it is registered.

=== Server cluster ===
Depending on application, a record inside a domain, or subdomain might refer to a hostname, or a service provided by a number of machines in a cluster. Some websites use different subdomains to point to different server clusters. For example, www.example.com points to Server Cluster 1 or Datacentre 1, and www2.example.com points to Server Cluster 2 or Datacentre 2 etc.

==== Subdomains vs. directories ====
Subdomains are different from directories. Directories are physical folders on an actual computer, while subdomains are a part of the URL that can be routed to any file or folder on the server machine.

== See also ==
- Domain name
- Hostname
- Subdirectory
- Subpage
- Vanity domain
- Webpage
