= Mobsyte =

Website-building software

- Company type: Web hosting
- Website type: Web Hosting
- Available in: English
- Founded: 2013
- Headquarters: Madrid, Spain
- Founder: Alejandro Sánchez Acosta
- Services: Web hosting service
- Website: www.mobsyte.com
- Launched: 2013
- Current status: Active

Mobsyte is a website builder that allows small owners, freelancers and professionals to create websites optimized for mobile, tablet and desktop. The company is headquartered in Madrid, Spain. It was founded by Alejandro Sánchez Acosta (CEO) in 2013.

== History ==
Alejandro Sánchez Acosta founded eMobc framework in 2012 to develop mobile and desktop apps. He used eMobc to build Mobsyte in 2013 in order to create websites optimized for mobile, tablet and desktop. Mobsyte has been finalist in several Acceleration Programs like StartupBootCamp, Plug and Play and many others.
