= Silex (disambiguation) =

Silex is any of various forms of ground stone.

Silex may also refer to:

== Places ==
- Silex, Arkansas, unincorporated community
- Silex, Missouri, village in Lincoln County, Missouri, United States

== Other ==
- Paul Silex (1858–1929), German ophthalmologist
- Proctor Silex, company that produced vacuum coffee makers and other small appliances
- Silex (website builder), free and open source HTML website builder
- Separation of isotopes by laser excitation, technique for uranium enrichment
