= Yola (webhost) =

Webhost

- Type: Privately held company
- Predecessor: Synthasite
- Founded: Cape Town, South Africa, March 2007
- Founder: Vinny Lingham; (Co-founder, former CEO); Brent Viljoen; (Co-founder and CPO)
- Headquarters: San Francisco, California, US
- Key people: Trevor Harries-Jones; (CEO); Brent Viljoen; (CPO); David Saxton; (VP of Business Development and Marketing); Lisa Retief; (VP of Engineering); Monique Viljoen-Platts; (VP of Customer Service)
- Products: Yola Web Site Builder
- Services: Website builder, Web hosting
- Number of employees: 76
- Website: yola.com

Yola (/ˈjoʊlə/) is a website builder and website hosting company headquartered in San Francisco. However, it was founded in Cape Town, South Africa. People without programming and graphic design skills can make web sites using Yola. Its drag and drop system allows users to incorporate widgets without knowing HTML. Yola also integrates e-commerce and blog software and acts as a domain registrar. It competes with other web hosting and creation such as Wix, Weebly, Site.pro, Framer, Jimdo and Webs.

== Corporate history ==
The business started out under the name SynthaSite, founded by Vinny Lingham in March 2007. In November 2007, the company raised a $5 million round of financing from Columbus Venture Capital and launched the beta version of the product.

In February 2009, SynthaSite announced $20 million in Series B funding from Reinet fund. The company was renamed Yola on March 26, 2009. Lingham said the rename was in anticipation of the company's future direction, and further that "the name SynthaSite has brought us to where we are today, but it won't take us where we want to go. We're reaching a global market and need a name that is easy to say, resonates in any language, and captures the creativity and excitement that our users bring to their Websites."

According to Yola's management, together with the Synthasite users, in January 2009 there were more than a million users of the tools, including small businesses, individuals and groups.

In February 2012, Yola introduced a fully functional online store that provides shopping cart functionality and gateways for various payment providers among other things. It is priced as a $10.00 per month add on for customers with a hosting package. The online store feature is being developed and maintained by a company called Ecwid. Yola users can now integrate this store widget into their websites via simple drag and drop. While this addition has been well received, critics point out that Yola will now be dependent on an external company for the development of one of their key features.

Yola's website indicated that there were more than 9 million Yola users in October 2013.

== Features ==
Yola offers different service levels: Free, Bronze, Silver, Gold and Premier. The free subscription includes one, three-page site, a download capacity of 1 GB, and basic web builder tools. Yola Bronze costs $49.95 a year and includes 2GB of storage, a custom domain with private registration as well as unlimited pages and bandwidth. Yola Silver version requires subscribers to pay an annual rate of $99.95. Silver has many additional features over Bronze, including an expanded storage capacity of 5GB, unlimited premium styles and mobile and Facebook publishing. It also includes the removal of any Yola branding from the user's sites, Google and Facebook ad credits and more web building tools. Yola Gold has features in addition to that of Silver, including keyword usage and traffic reporting, automatic SEO monitoring and full-site search optimization scans and has an annual fee of $199.95. Each package is also available at a monthly price for $5.95 for Bronze, $12.95 for Silver and $24.95 for Gold.

Yola Premier package costs a one-time fee of $499.95 and includes one-on-one consultations with a designer, professional 5 page website, and all the benefits of Yola Silver. The package renews at the regular Yola Silver rate.

Users can purchase domain names in .com, .net, .org, and .biz, as well as other country codes, such as .com.br, .mx, .co.uk, .ca, and others. Domains are free with the purchase of annual packages and start at $11.95 per year. The Yola Silver package. enables users to have a clear footer without Yola branding. Private WHOIS registration is also included in annual packages and is available for purchase at $9.95 per year.

Yola also offers a professional email service, called Yola Mail, that provides users with a complete mailbox for their custom domains and unlimited aliases that are managed from one inbox. Yola Mail is available for $9.96 per year.

== Awards and honors ==
- 2008 Fast 50 Reader Favorites
- 2008 Industry Standard 100 Award
- 2008 Webuser's Gold Award
- 2009 R.E.C.S.S Support Awards
- 2010 R.E.C.S.S Support Awards
- 2011 R.E.C.S.S Support Awards

Yola was also selected as an Endeavor (non-profit) Entrepreneur in 2006.

== See also ==
- Website builder
