= TOWeb =

- The page editor of TOWeb 15 on macOS
- Developer: Lauyan Software
- Stable release: 15.0.3 / 2 November 2026
- Operating system: Microsoft Windows 10 and 11, macOS 13 or later
- Type: Website builder, HTML editor
- License: Proprietary (freemium)
- Website: Lauyan Software

TOWeb is a WYSIWYG website and online store builder for Microsoft Windows and macOS that requires no programming knowledge. Since 2013, it creates HTML5/CSS3 responsive websites compatible with smartphones, tablets and computers. Version 15, released in October 2026, is a complete rewrite that runs natively on macOS (Apple silicon and Intel) and Windows, works offline, and can be driven by an AI assistant through the Model Context Protocol.

== History ==
The first version of TOWeb was developed during 2 years from 2003 to 2005 under the project name "WebGen". It was primarily intended for beginners without any HTML knowledge in website creation. The first version 1.0 was released on August 6, 2005. The following releases 2.0, 3.0, 4.0 brought new features such as the ability to create online stores. Version 5.0, released in June 2013, introduced the Responsive Web Design approach, allowing the creation of websites compatible with any device.

== Features ==
- Responsive websites
- Website templates
- Live preview and content editing
- HTML5 & CSS3
- Pages, Albums, Catalogs
- E-commerce module with customer accounts
- Online booking system
- AI-assisted content creation, local or cloud-based
- Control by AI assistants through the Model Context Protocol (MCP)
- YouTube, TikTok & HTML5 videos, Google maps, Leaflet OpenStreetMap
- Multilingual websites
- GDPR compliance tools
- Built-in FTP, FTPS and SFTP uploader
- Built-in accessibility features, sitemap, structured data and hreflang generation

== Version history ==
- Version 15.0 released on October 27, 2026, after public beta versions in October 2026, is a complete rewrite of both the application and the engine that generates the websites. It runs natively on macOS as a universal application for Apple silicon and Intel processors, signed and notarized, replacing the previous macOS version that relied on Wine, and on Windows 10 and 11. Text is edited directly on the page, and content blocks (galleries, testimonials, pricing tables, FAQs, maps, videos, before-and-after comparisons, embeds) are inserted with a slash command. Complete visual styles change typography, colours, shapes and effects together, in light and dark modes. An integrated AI assistant writes copy, generates pages and translates sites, either locally through Ollama or with cloud models. In the Studio edition, TOWeb can be controlled by an external AI assistant such as Claude, ChatGPT or Gemini through the Model Context Protocol (MCP), which can create pages, texts, images, online stores and translations. The online store supports product variants, stock, shipping by zone, discount codes, downloadable products and European VAT, and the booking module handles time slots and periods; orders, invoices and bookings are managed from a web dashboard. Accessibility is handled by the engine (labels, contrast, skip link, keyboard navigation), and generated sites include a sitemap, structured data, hreflang tags and redirects, and are published by FTP or SFTP to any web host. Sites made with TOWeb 5 to 14 can be imported. The Standard edition is free with no time limit, while the Premium, e-Commerce and Studio editions are one-time purchases without subscription.
- Version 14.0 released on November 28, 2025, introduces an online booking system for managing time slots, overnight stays and resources, with automatic confirmation emails and back-office management. It integrates an artificial intelligence assistant for content creation accessible when editing paragraphs. This version adds tabbed paragraphs, multi-column mega menus, a before/after image comparison slider, and the ability to offer different payment methods by country. The e-Commerce back-office supports CSV export of orders. New editing features include site-wide search and replace, a collapsible secondary side menu, and chronological sorting of blog topics. The publishing module integrates post-quantum cryptography support and an upgrade to OpenSSL 3. Optimizations for AI agents are available through new meta tags. 175 new Google Fonts are added.
- Version 13.0 released on November 29, 2024, transitions to 64-bit architecture. It introduces a site versioning system allowing multiple versions of the same project to be maintained. Copy-paste preserves HTML formatting and automatically converts Markdown format. A newsletter subscription popup can be displayed to visitors. PHP email sending supports SMTP servers through PHPMailer integration. E-Commerce payment script security is enhanced for PayPal, Stripe, Monetico and French banks. A dedicated e-Commerce step centralizes product management. Product pages can display image grids alternating large images with thumbnails. The user interface offers a light/dark mode following operating system settings. Cloudflare Turnstile is offered as an alternative to Google reCAPTCHA for form protection without personal data collection. Native support for WebP images, including animated WebP, is added. The macOS version is optimized with announced performance gains of 3 to 5 times and Retina display support. 159 new Google Fonts are added.
- Version 12.0 released on November 24, 2023, adapts the user interface to 4K+ high-resolution screens and Windows HiDPI mode. It introduces an announcement banner displayable at the top of all site pages, and an undo button to cancel changes made since the last save. Date fields in forms can define minimum and maximum dates, display week numbers and handle date ranges. Cookie consent management is enhanced with a button allowing visitors to modify their choices at any time. PayPal Checkout V2 replaces PayPal Standard and offers installment payments. 3D-Secure version 2 protocol is supported for Monetico, Crédit Mutuel, CIC and Crédit Agricole systems. The product search engine displays results with the same layout as catalogs and includes add-to-cart buttons. The Studio edition allows simultaneous backup of multiple sites. The FTP publishing module is upgraded to OpenSSL 1.1.1. 80 new Google Fonts are added.
- Version 11.0 released in mid-November 2022 adds parallax effect template management, automatic TikTok video integration and mobile vertical video format support, a blogging mode with automatic publication of recent articles similar to WordPress or Wix news extensions, Google Analytics 4 support (compliant with GDPR requirements), advanced dynamic form management, a redesigned editor, template and topic import/export capabilities, and an integrated email marketing tool.
- Version 10.0 released on November 26, 2021, brings new e-Commerce features such as customer accounts, support of Stripe payments, images by sub-products, a re-designed checkout process, a single-product shopping cart mode but also a support of PHP 8, SVG images and an improved display and navigation of the generated websites for a better mobile first experience.
- Version 9.0 released on November 13, 2020, introduces Click & Collect delivery mode, order status tracking from the back-office with customer email notifications, a centralized back-office interface, customizable cookie consent management for GDPR compliance, paragraph positioning beside background images, PDF export of pages, Lottie animation support, a portfolio-style photo wall display for albums, lazy loading and WebP image format support for improved page loading performance, and QR code generation.
- Version 8.0 released on September 10, 2019, brings the possibility of playing background videos, displaying texts when hovering over images, using or importing any web fonts, better secure web forms with Google reCAPTCHA, improved SEO of a site and its sharing on social networks as well as improvements for online sales such as the backoffice able to update the stock of products in real time, MondialRelay delivery support and volume pricing.
- Version 7.0 released on December 4, 2017, provides the ability to create single-page sites or multi-page sites with full-screen paragraphs and pages using parallax effect. It introduces many widgets (such as key figures, notes, plans & prices, responsive tables, user reviews with star ratings, timelines, time counters or forms), optimizations for faster page loading and a new integrated FTP/SFTP/FTPS publishing module. It also provides features to assist in making websites compliant with the General Data Protection Regulation (GDPR).
- Version 6.0 released June 23, 2015 introduced the ability to create new types of pages (calendars, articles, agreement page), the support for Retina displays, photo albums in full screen, new effects on images, new objects (such as graphs, countdowns, Twitter feed or timestamps), an integrated website optimizer tool to improve the SEO of sites and new e-commerce capabilities such as sales of digital files (e-books, music, photos, etc.) and management of related products.
- Version 5.0 released June 18, 2013 introduced a fully rewritten editor and generator for creating responsive websites, live previewing and editing. Many features from former versions were removed such as the outdated theme generator and the wiki editor.
- Version 4.0 released June 16, 2011 introduced unicode support, a rewritten e-commerce module, Google Maps and YouTube objects, polls, automatic translations.
- Version 3.0 released June 19, 2009 introduced server side PHP scripting (i-services), ads insertion, SEO features, Microsoft Word & Microsoft Excel import.
- Version 2.0 released June 19, 2007 introduced a new user interface, Windows Vista compatibility, submenus, slideshows, HTML scripting, RSS feeds.
- Version 1.07 released January 31, 2006 introduced the e-commerce features for the first time in TOWeb.
- Version 1.0 was released August 6, 2005.

== Language availability ==
TOWeb is available in the following languages: English, French, German, Italian, Spanish, Portuguese, Dutch.

== See also ==
- List of HTML editors
- Responsive web design
- Tableless web design
