= IM Creator =

IM Creator Ltd.
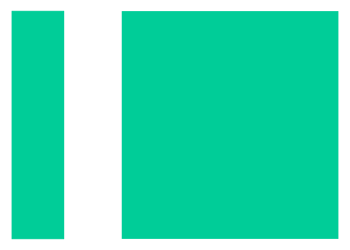
- Company type: Private
- Industry: Internet
- Founded: 2011; 15 years ago
- Founder: Jonathan Saragossi
- Headquarters: New York, New York
- Area served: Worldwide
- Key people: Jonathan Saragossi (CEO)
- Products: SaaS-based hosting platform
- Services: Website builder, Web hosting service, Stock photography
- Number of employees: 68 (2016)
- Website: www.imcreator.com

IM Creator, or IM, (/ˈaɪm/) is a software and hosting company headquartered in New York City with an office in Tel Aviv, Israel. IM Creator was founded by CEO Jonathan Saragossi in 2011. IM Creator's tools allow individuals and businesses to create and maintain HTML5 websites, blogs and online stores without writing code. All services are bundled, and hosting by IM is mandatory.

== History ==
IM Creator was founded in early 2011 by chief executive officer (CEO) Jonathan Saragossi, who formerly worked for Wix as the VP of its design team. The company, headquartered in New York City with an office in Tel Aviv, Israel, is backed by angel investors sought out prior to its launch. A few months after inception, IM Creator entered its open beta phase using a platform based on HTML.

Three to five months after open-beta, IM Creator was featured in a news article by The New York Times, CBS News and The Next Web online newspapers. NYTimes revealed that IM Creator claimed to have over 2,000 paying customers and raised over $300,000 from friends and family within its starting months.

A year later the company launched IM Creator Mobile Website Builder (branded as IXM), and in 2014, IM Free—a curated collection of free resources, all for commercial use.

In 2015, IM Creator introduced its latest platform (previously known as IM XPRS) along its older website builder now commonly referred to as the legacy product. The differences between the two sitebuilders is the site creation process, and that its latest platform allows for the creation of responsive websites using flat UI. Existing sites built in the legacy product continue to be supported, but all new customers are directed to the new platform. The company also launched IM Self, a blog creator for mobile devices.
