= WYM =

WYM, or wym, may refer to:

- WYM editor, an open-source WYSIWYM text editor for editing content on web pages
- wym, the ISO 639-3 code for the Wymysorys language spoken in the town of Wilamowice, Poland
- WYM, the National Rail code for Wylam railway station in Northumberland, England
