= PageCloud =

Software company in Canada

PageCloud Inc.
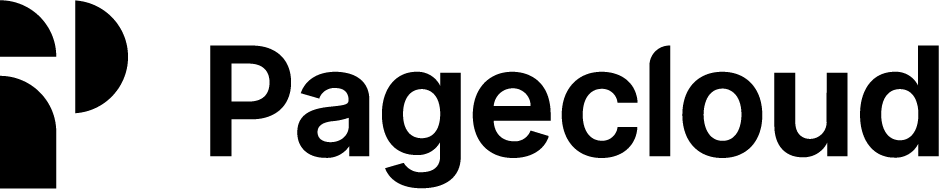
- Pagecloud website builder logo
- Company type: Private
- Website type: SaaS-based hosting platform
- Headquarters: Ottawa, Ontario
- Area served: Worldwide
- Founder: Craig Fitzpatrick
- CEO: Mike Grouchy
- Industry: Internet
- Products: Website
- Services: Website builder; Web hosting service
- Website: www.pagecloud.com
- Registration: Required; subscription needed for certain features.
- Launched: May 2015; 11 years ago

PageCloud is a software as a service, cloud-based web development platform and drag and drop website builder. The platform allows individuals and businesses to create and maintain websites. PageCloud was founded by Chief executive officer Craig Fitzpatrick and is headquartered in Ottawa, Canada.

In 2015, PageCloud was a finalist in the TechCrunch Disrupt Startup Battlefield.

== History ==
PageCloud was founded in 2014 and officially launched in May 2015 by Craig Fitzpatrick at TechCrunch Disrupt. For seed funding he relied on investments from other software entrepreneurs, including Shopify CEO Tobias Lütke. Fitzpatrick created the initial software after the sale of previous startup Source Metrics, where he became frustrated with how difficult it was to build and run a website.

=== Finances ===
During its pre-sale period, the company surpassed $1 million in pre-orders, selling 10,000 licenses before the platform was made publicly available. In November 2016, PageCloud closed a $4 million Series A round, after initially projecting it would do a $10 million Series A.

== Product ==
PageCloud is designed for companies who need websites with less than 30 pages. It provides customizable templates and a drag and drop HTML website builder that includes apps, graphics, image galleries, fonts, and more.

== Leadership ==
- Mike Grouchy - Chief Executive Officer
- Mark Murray - Chief Financial Officer
- Mark Stephenson - Chief of Design
