= Eric Lux =

Luxembourgish businessperson

Éric Lux
- Born: 19 December 1967 (age 58); Esch-sur-Alzette, Luxembourg
- Education: Lausanne Business School
- Occupations: CEO, Genii Capital

Éric Roger Lux (born 19 December 1967) is a Luxembourgish businessman. He is the CEO of Genii Capital, co-founded with Gerard Lopez, an investment management and financial member of the Genii Group and former owner of the Lotus F1 Team. He is also CEO of the real estate investment group Ikodomos Holding and real estate developer company Iko (previously Ikogest).

== Biography ==
Lux graduated from Switzerland's Lausanne Business School in 1993. Between 1994 and 1997, he worked as a consultant, specialising in process engineering, activity-based management and total quality management. Lux took over the Ikodomos Holding group in 1997, growing it into one of Luxembourg's leading real estate investment and development organisations. The company now has business activities throughout Europe and Asia. In 2008, he co-founded Genii Capital, a private investment management and financial advisory firm, with Gerard Lopez. He is fluent in English, French, German and Luxembourgish.

== Nightclub incident ==
On 17 April 2011, Lux was struck in the neck with a broken champagne glass by Formula One driver Adrian Sutil whilst at a nightclub in Shanghai. Lux filed a criminal complaint against Sutil for physical assault and grievous bodily harm. In January 2012 Sutil was found guilty by a court in Munich and given an 18-month suspended prison sentence and fined €200,000. Sutil later planned to appeal his sentence, as well as the prosecutor, though Sutil decided against it.

== Damage to reputation ==
Several media revealed in 2022 that Eric Lux had been the target of an online smear campaign orchestrated by his former associate Flavio Becca through a communications agency.

== Suspicions of wrongdoing ==
According to the documents of the Mossack Fonseca firm, Gravity Sport Management, Eric Lux’s society, would be involved in the Panama Papers, tax evasion scandal.

The Ban Manor buyout to the Charlie Chaplin Foundation has provoked the resignation of the manor’s treasurer because of the lack of transparency of the funds used for the buyout. Philippe Meylan, the land developer has himself admitted that « the Genii capital participation can include some Russian funds » according to the newspaper Le Monde.

Furthermore, Lux's name has been mentioned in the money deprivation scandal of the Malaysian fund, 1MDB. The Luxembourger Wort has revealed that the Lux's partner, Gérard Lopez, has met Tarek Obaid and his partner Turki Bin Abdullah Al Saoud (suspected in this scandal), while the origin of the funds used for the F1 was difficult to recover.
