= WebMaker CMS =

UK website builder company

WebMaker
- Company type: Trading division of Insight Group Private company
- Industry: Website Builder Software and Web hosting service
- Founded: 1988; 38 years ago
- Headquarters: London, England, UK
- Key people: Mark Robson, partner Maureen Robson, partner
- Products: WebMaker CMS – a starter level website builder WebMaker PRO - professional level with all features included WebMaker Shop – an ecommerce website builder
- Website: www.webmakercms.com

WebMaker CMS is a UK-based company which markets an online website builder package called WebMaker CMS, a website builder. The product provides free hosting for the first year, which is renewed by annual fee. WebMaker has a number of add-ons or plug-ins/widgets, enabling customers to add extra features as and when they are needed by selecting them from within the WebMaker product. WebMaker is sold by the UK marketing agency, Insight Group, based in Bracknell, Berkshire, UK.

== History ==
Insight Group launched WebMaker CMS in 2011, having already been a designer and builder of websites using higher-level website building solutions such as the Kameleon content management system.
