= Waitroom =

Livestreaming and video meeting platform

Waitroom is a host-led livestreaming and video meeting platform that allows one-on-one engagement between hosts and their audiences. These engagements can range from 30 seconds to 30 minutes long. Waitroom was co-founded in the summer of 2020 by entrepreneurs Vinny Lingham, Margaret Grobler, and Michael Gaylord. The company has raised $3 million in seed funding and its lead investor is venture capital firm Craft Ventures.

Waitroom is headquartered in San Diego, California, and has 15 full-time and 6 part-time employees.
