= Avishai Abrahami =

Israeli entrepreneur and software developer

- Born: May 3, 1971 (age 55); Jerusalem, Israel
- Occupations: CEO of Wix.com; Entrepreneur; Software developer; Business person; Investor
- Years active: 2006 - Present
- Known for: Co-founder and CEO of Wix.com
- Board member of: Wix.com; monday.com; Open Web; Unlimited Robotics
- Children: 2 (daughters)

Avishai Abrahami (Hebrew: אֲבִישַׁי אַבְרָהָמִי born May 3, 1971) is an entrepreneur, software developer, business person and investor. He is the co-founder and CEO of Wix.com, a SaaS website building platform.

== Early life and education ==
Abrahami was born and raised in Israel. Abrahami carried out his mandatory military service in the Israel Defense Forces’ in the Unit 8200 cybersecurity unit. Abrahami left Unit 8200 in 1992 and went to college. He dropped out after three months.

In 2006, Abrahami co-founded Wix.com with his brother, Nadav Abrahami, and Giora Kaplan. When the company was founded, Abrahami became the CEO. When the company became publicly traded, Abrahami became board chair in addition to his existing role as the CEO. In 2016, Abrahami became honorary chairman and Mark Tluszcz became chairman of the board. During the COVID-19 pandemic, Abrahami presided over record growth of the company as many customers moved their businesses online. The company reached $12 billion market capitalization in the summer of 2020.

== Investments ==
Abrahami is an active angel investor. In 2022, it was reported that he had stakes in 14 different companies which made exits.

Founder, Roy Mann, met Abrahami as an employee at Wix when he started what later became Monday.com. Wix became the first customer and Man explained that Abrahami "helped us identify the challenge of harnessing people at work into a certain direction" Abrahami was an initial investor alongside Insight Venture Partners and others. He joined the board of directors in 2012 and owned a 4% stake in the company at IPO in 2021.

Abrahami had invested and was on the board of Soluto, an IT support firm, before selling his share in the business when it was acquired by Asurion in 2013 for $130 million.

Alongside Oren Zeev, Gigi Levy-Weiss, Sir Ronald Cohen and others, Abrahami was an early investor in health startup Lumen

Abrahami was a seed investor in Unlimited Robotics, alongside Micha Kauffman, CEO and co-founder of Fiverr.

== Personal life ==
Abrahami lives in Israel. His interests include AI, entrepreneurship, and coding. He practices Ninjutsu. He is married and has two daughters.
