= NextPage, Inc. =

Kansas City, Missouri company

- Company type: Privately held company
- Founded: 1988
- Founder: Haver "Dan" Danner
- Headquarters: Kansas City, Missouri
- Area served: US
- Services: Direct Marketing; Printing; Variable Data Printing; Web-To-Print; Marketing asset management Marketing Automation
- Revenue: US$17,700,000 (2008)
- Owner: Eric Danner, Gina Danner, Larry Wittmeyer
- Number of employees: 100+
- Website: GoNextPage.com

Logo for Mail Print, Inc.

NextPage, Inc. is a direct marketing and variable data printing company located in Kansas City, Missouri. The company's customers include national franchises and organizations, and include more than 14,000 users of their "Marketing Communications Portal" product. In February 2013, Mail Print merged with Graphic Services Printing and L&L Manufacturing to form NextPage.

== Company history ==
NextPage was originally established in 1988 under the name Mail & More by Haver Danner. Children Eric, Gina and Kyle Danner later joined the business and transitioned it to a personalized direct marketing and commercial printing provider, under the name of Mail Print. NextPage was created in 2013 when three strong regional print providers, Mail Print, L & L Manufacturing and Graphic Services, merged to form one company. NextPage is owned by Eric Danner, Gina Danner and Larry Wittmeyer, Jr.

In 2015, NextPage acquired Print Big Solutions.

=== Revenue & Company Growth ===
As of January 2009, NextPage was listed as the 5th largest commercial printing company in the Kansas City area. Archives of the Kansas City Business Journal's yearly "Top Area Commercial Printing Companies" lists detail the following growth:

Year	Revenue	Rank	Employees
2008	$17.7 million	5	82
2005	$13.2 million	5	74
2004	$11.35 million	9	67
2003	$10.07 million	Not listed	Not listed
2002	$7.2 million	16	47
2001	$6.1 million	19	43
2000	$4.9 million	21	42

=== Innovations ===
In 2001, NextPage publicly launched their "Marketing Communications Portal," an online marketing asset management and ordering system for use by organizations and franchises to create and execute direct marketing materials.

NextPage began using the Hewlett-Packard line of Indigo digital presses in 2002, which allowed for variable data print personalization by integrating database information during the digital printing process. As an early adopter of the technology, NextPage served as a HP test site.

In 2007, NextPage introduced a marketing automation tool that delivered a stream of automatic sales touches on a salesperson's behalf. The automated campaigns could be initiated to a single prospect or mailing list.

Other proprietary marketing systems include "Oyster," a user interface and database for creating and producing Personalized URLs.
