= Bootstrap Studio =

Proprietary web design and development application

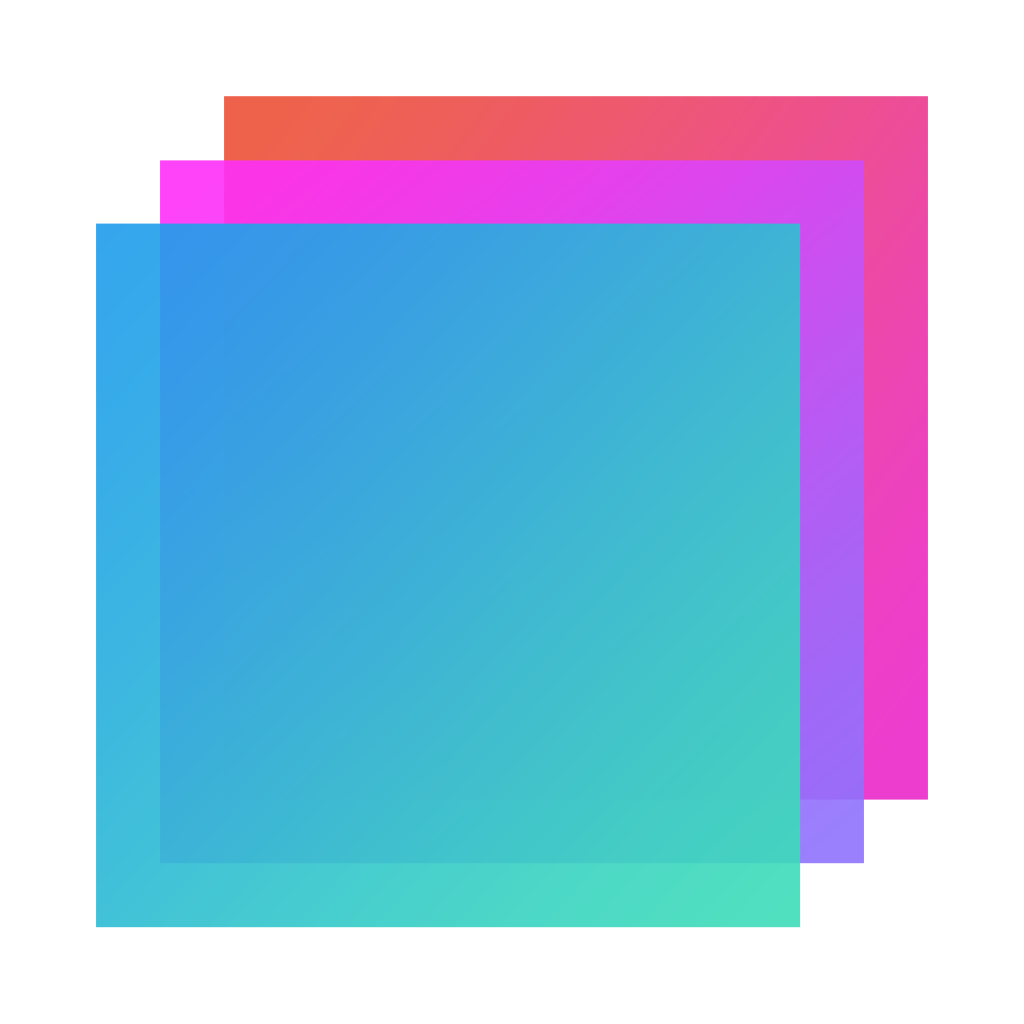
- Release: October 19, 2015
- Stable release: 9.0.1 / October 23, 2026; 6 days ago
- Operating system: Windows, macOS, Linux
- Type: WYSIWYG, Website builder, HTML editor
- License: Proprietary
- Website: bootstrapstudio.io

Bootstrap Studio is a proprietary web design and development application. It offers a large number of components for building responsive pages including headers, footers, galleries and slideshows along with basic elements, such as spans and divs.

The program can be used for building websites and prototypes. It is built on the popular Electron framework, and is cross-platform.

== History ==
Bootstrap Studio was launched on October 19, 2015 with a post on Product Hunt where it reached number 4 in the Product of the Day category. Version 2.0 of the software was released on January 22, 2016 and brought JavaScript editing, multi-page support and improved the CSS support. Version 4.0 was launched on November 1, 2017. The release added support for the Bootstrap 4 framework and CSS grid, filters, position sticky and blend mode CSS properties. On August 22, 2019, Bootstrap Studio was officially introduced into the GitHub Student Pack, making it available to students from around the world. Bootstrap Studio v6.7.0 updated Bootstrap to v5.3.3 on May 30, 2024.
