= Adobe PageMill =

HTML editor software

- Developer: Adobe Systems
- Initial release: 1994
- Operating system: Mac OS and Microsoft Windows
- Type: HTML editor
- License: Proprietary

PageMill is a WYSIWYG HTML editor developed by Adobe Systems in 1994. After PageMill 3.0, it was discontinued in favor of GoLive.

== History ==
Ceneca Communications Inc. developed the original PageMill and SiteMill products. During open beta testing, Adobe acquired the company and rebranded the product with their own logo. Adobe released PageMill 1.0 in late 1995. It was considered revolutionary at the time, as it was the first HTML editor that was considered user-friendly, cited as the "PageMaker of the WWW". This first version, however, was also criticized for lacking items such as a spell-checker and support for creating HTML tables. Adobe acquired Ceneca in October 1995 for US$15 million.

Adobe PageMill 2.0, which was introduced in early 1997, corrected these issues with a package that, according to one review, "adds more features than I have fingers and toes… PageMill with its tables, frames, graphics, and support for form interfaces, makes it easy to lay out a page". PageMill 2.0 was also the first version for Microsoft Windows.

Adobe PageMill 3.0, released in early 1999, supported embedded font commands and a site-management feature. It was discontinued in February 2000, due to the acquisition and promotion of Adobe GoLive. A later patch, still available from Adobe, fixed a problem with FTP upload.

PageMill was often bundled with other products such as scanners or promotional CD-ROMs, rather than sold as a stand-alone product.

== See also ==
- List of HTML editors
- History of the Internet
