= Genii Capital =

Luxembourger financial firm

- Founded: 2008
- Founder: Eric Lux and Gerard Lopez
- Headquarters: Howald, Luxembourg
- Key people: Eric Lux (CEO); Gerard Lopez (Chairman)
- Services: Investment management and financial advisory
- Divisions: Genii Business Exchange
- Website: genii-capital.com

Genii Capital (simply known as Genii and stylized as GƎИII) is an international financial advisory and investment firm, which specialises in brand management, technology, motorsport and a range of venture capital activities. It was created in 2008, by two Luxembourger investors, Gerard Lopez and Eric Lux and has a particular focus on emerging markets, including the BRIC (Brazil, Russia, India and China) nations. Genii Capital focuses on a wide range of investment vehicles and also provides advisory services on topics ranging from the preparation of an IPO, the joint development of businesses, mergers and acquisitions and capital markets. As a result of a global restructuring initiative in 2011, Genii Capital is now located in the finance division of the Genii Group, a global enterprise overseeing the business activities of Lux and Lopez.

== Genii's investment interests ==
=== Formula One ===
On 16 December 2009, it was announced that Genii were to purchase a large stake in the Renault F1 Team. Genii beat Prodrive head David Richards to the deal. Genii was likely to merge the Renault Driver Development programme with its own Gravity Sport Management company, which manages drivers such as Ho-Pin Tung, who tested for the Renault team in 2009, as well as Christian Vietoris.

On 8 December 2010, Renault made public it would sell its remaining 25% share in the Enstone-based team, Renault F1 team, to Genii Capital, from that moment the sole shareholder. Group Lotus immediately became a partner of the team, renamed Lotus Renault GP. It was projected that the carmaker company would purchase a significant share of it. The team was known as the Lotus F1 Team from 2012 until 2015, when the team was sold back to Renault after the team experienced funding issues.

=== Other ===
On 26 January 2009, PHC Acquisitions LLC, affiliate of Genii Capital, become a stalking horse bidder of Polaroid Holding Company. The agreement included the purchase of Polaroid's assets as intellectual rights, name and brand.

On 7 January 2010, it was announced that Genii would, "hand in a cash offer" for Swedish carmaker Saab Automobile, together with Formula One commercial boss Bernard Ecclestone. The proposition was finally dismissed.

In December 2011, it was announced that Genii Capital led in $35 million of financing for Zink Imaging, a printing technology company, through the Genii Business Exchange.

=== Expansion strategy ===
On 29 July 2011, Genii Capital, which already had interests in Europe, Asia and North America, disembarked in Brazil through a joint venture with WWI Group. This is part of the Genii's current expansion strategy in BRIC countries. In April 2012, Genii Capital announced the launch of an office in Geneva as part of its expansion strategy.

== Genii Business Exchange ==
Genii Business Exchange is an adjunct to Genii Capital. The Genii Business Exchange is a business platform providing a forum for a global network of high-net-worth individuals, opinion leaders, political leaders and those involved with Formula One.

It was founded by Lux and Lopez in 2010, and is hosted in many of the world's financial centres, but with a particular focus on emerging economies including BRIC and MENA countries.

Since the acquisition of the Enstone-based Formula One team from Renault (subsequently renamed from "Renault F1" to "Lotus Renault GP") by Genii Capital three-time Formula One world champion Sir Jackie Stewart OBE has worked with the Genii Business Exchange. Former President of BAE Systems, Sir Charles Masefield joined The Genii Group as a strategic advisor in June 2012.
