= Flok (company) =

American tech startup based in New York City

flok
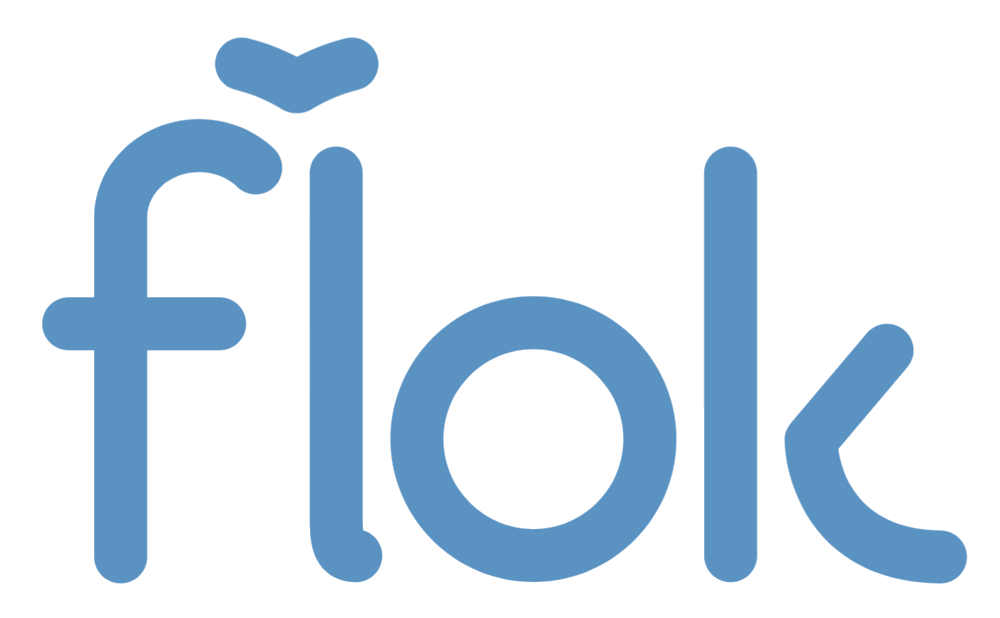
- Type: Subsidiary
- Industry: Mobile, Apps, Chatbots, Loyalty Programs
- Founded: 2011; 15 years ago
- Defunct: 2020; 6 years ago
- Headquarters: New York City
- Parent: Wix.com
- Website: flok.com (no longer active; now used by another company with the same name)

Flok (formerly Loyalblocks) was an American tech startup based in New York City that provides marketing services such as chatbots/AI, customer loyalty programs, mobile apps and CRM services to local businesses.

In January 2017, the company was acquired by Wix.com. Around March 2017, Flok ceased regular communication.

At some point in 2019 Flok communicated to its customers that it would shut down in March 2020.

== Background ==
Flok was founded in 2011 by Ido Gaver and Eran Kirshenboim and has offices in Tel Aviv, Israel. In May 2013, Flok secured a $9 million Series A Round from General Catalyst Partners with participation from Founder Collective and existing investor Gemini Israel Ventures. In total, Flok has raised over $18 million in venture capital in three rounds.

In May 2014, Flok announced a self-service loyalty platform for SMBs to build their own programs with beacon integration. At that time, approximately 40,000 businesses were using the service. In 2016, Flok released a turnkey chatbot service for local businesses, and was featured in AdWeek for developing the first weed bot chatbot for a California cannabis business.

== Services ==
Flok offered an eponymous customer-facing app, that consumers use to receive rewards and deals from partner businesses, and a Flok business app for merchants to manage the platform.
