= Moment.me =

Former web service

Moment.me was a web service and application that collected all of the pics, videos and tweets from everyone at a single event to allow users to see a complete panoramic view of what happened at that event, from multiple points of view, and in real time.

In 2015 the company was acquired by another Israeli company, Wix.com, in a deal estimated at $10 million. The defunct service's technology has been incorporated into Wix.

== Early history ==
Moment.me was launched in 2012. In May 2012, the New York-based startup, founded by Ronny Elkayam, Boaz Adato and Eilon Tirosh, took in US$1.5 million in seed funding from Blumberg Capital, SingTel Innov8 and private investors. The company’s smart-matching technology, called HintMachine, could turn out-of-context digital assets into cohesive shared albums.

Moment.me was first launched as a web platform and later became available for mobile devices (iOS and Android). It could be embedded on any website for social coverage of specific events. The embed feature has been used on sites such as Fox News and MSNBC news to show social coverage of the Obama re-election and inauguration on January 20, 2013, and has been used for major sporting events such as the Super Bowl.

== General information ==
The purpose of Moment.me was to track down and organize all the social content users and their friends created at a shared event, using their varied social networks (Facebook, Instagram, Twitter, Google+…etc.). Moment.me also allowed users to start a moment of their own and invite friends to contribute content to it, apply photo filters and add comments.

Moment.me claimed to have an image database of over 4.5 billion items and a growth rate of more than 50 million photos per day, relying on cross-app connectivity and a non-dependency approach, plus the ability to take pictures directly from the moment.me app.

The company employed textual analysis, image processing, data clustering and a variety of other methods to capture relevant content and present them as moments. Moment.me claimed to take cloud use to a new level, creating content discovery and “cross-cloud” functionality that works with all the big social networks. The algorithms scoured the various social network clouds (Instagram, Picasa, Facebook, Google+, Twitter, and Flickr) and match each photo with over 4.5 billion other photos in its extended database in order to create a complete view of moments around the world.

Moment.me claimed to enforce the privacy settings of the networks from which the images are sourced. This means that, if a user uploaded a private image, only that user could see that image, and a "friends only" image is available only to friends who are also registered to moment.me, whereas public images will be available to all moment.me users.
