= Webflow =

American software company

Webflow, Inc.

- Website type: Web development
- Headquarters: San Francisco, California
- Area served: Worldwide
- Founders: Vlad Magdalin; Sergie Magdalin; Bryant Chou
- Employees: 501–1000
- Website: https://webflow.com
- Commercial: Yes
- Launched: August 5, 2013
- Current status: Active

Webflow, Inc. is an American company, based in San Francisco, that provides software as a service for website building and hosting. Their online visual editor platform allows users to design, build, and launch websites. According to W3Techs, in 2025, Webflow is used by 1.2% of the top 10 million websites. Among Y Combinator companies in the 2024 and 2025 batches, 10.2% used Webflow for their homepage, behind Framer at 13.7%, after leading in every earlier batch block.

== Overview ==
Webflow is a SaaS application that allows designers to build responsive websites with browser-based visual editing software. While designers use the tool, Webflow automatically generates HTML, CSS, and JavaScript.

Webflow also offers an AI site builder that can create and customize websites from verbal descriptions.

== Company ==
Webflow was founded in 2013 by Vlad Magdalin, Sergie Magdalin, and Bryant Chou. The company graduated from Y Combinator's startup accelerator in 2013. Webflow raised venture funding from Khosla Ventures, Y Combinator, Tim Draper, and other tech industry investors. In 2019, Webflow raised a $72 million series A round of funding led by Accel. In January 2021, Webflow raised $140 million in a series B round of funding. In October 2024, Webflow acquired GreenSock, the company behind the JavaScript animation library GSAP. Webflow's current CEO is Linda Tong (from June 2024), who joined Webflow as a COO in June 2022.

In March 2026, Webflow acquired Vidoso.ai, a four-person startup which used AI for content marketing generation. The financial terms of the acquisition were not disclosed.

== See also ==
- List of HTML editors
