= Shippo (company) =

American software company

Popout, Inc.
- Founded: 2013
- Area served: United States, Canada, UK, France, Germany, Australia
- Founders: Laura Behrens Wu; Simon Kreuz; Max Diez
- Website: goshippo.com
- Current status: Active

Popout, Inc. DBA Shippo is an American e-commerce software company.

== Business ==
Shippo was founded in 2013 and is headquartered in San Francisco, California. 100,000 businesses reportedly use their system.

Shippo provides an API, web interface, as well as direct integrations with e-commerce platforms such as eBay, Amazon, Shopify, Etsy, Magento, Bigcommerce, Weebly, GoDaddy, and Stripe. Shippo aggregates customers’ packages to receive discounted rates, which are then passed onto customers. They help businesses generate shipping labels, as well as support for address validation, multi-carrier support, API tracking, batch label creation, discounts and international shipping. Shippo also partners with supply chain management systems such as Sellbrite, Selro, and SnapFulfil.

Shippo is one of eBay's Guaranteed Delivery Program shipping partner platforms.

Their offerings cater primarily to online marketplaces, platforms, and e-commerce businesses, assisting with the integration of shipping from multiple carriers via API and web applications. Shippo's services include the comparison of shipping rates, the creation of labels, the generation of international customs documents, return labels, and parcel tracking.

== History ==
In March 2016, Shippo became a United States Postal Service ePostage partner alongside Amazon and Etsy.

Laura Behrens Wu is the CEO and co-founder of Shippo. She and co-founder, Simon Kreuz, are both part of Forbes' 30 Under 30 2017 Enterprise Technology list. Wu was featured in the 2016 LinkedIn Next Wave: Top Professionals 35 & Under list.

Shippo participated in Plug and Play's StartupCamp in January 2014 and was a part of 500 Startups Batch 8. In 2014, they raised $2 million in seed funding led by SoftTechVC. Jeff Clavier, Managing Partner of SoftTechVC, also sat on Shippo's board of directors. In September 2016, Shippo announced a Series A round of $7 million led by Union Square Ventures with Albert Wenger joining their board, as Jeff Clavier steps off. In October 2017, Shippo announced that it had raised an additional $20 million in a round of Series B funding led by Bessemer Venture Partners.

By December 2017, the company had a total of funding of $30 million.

In 2018, Shippo launched a feature for retailers that allows them to track packages as they travel to customers. In October 2019, Shippo and UPS announced a plans for an app for small and mid-sized retailers.
