= OpenRest =

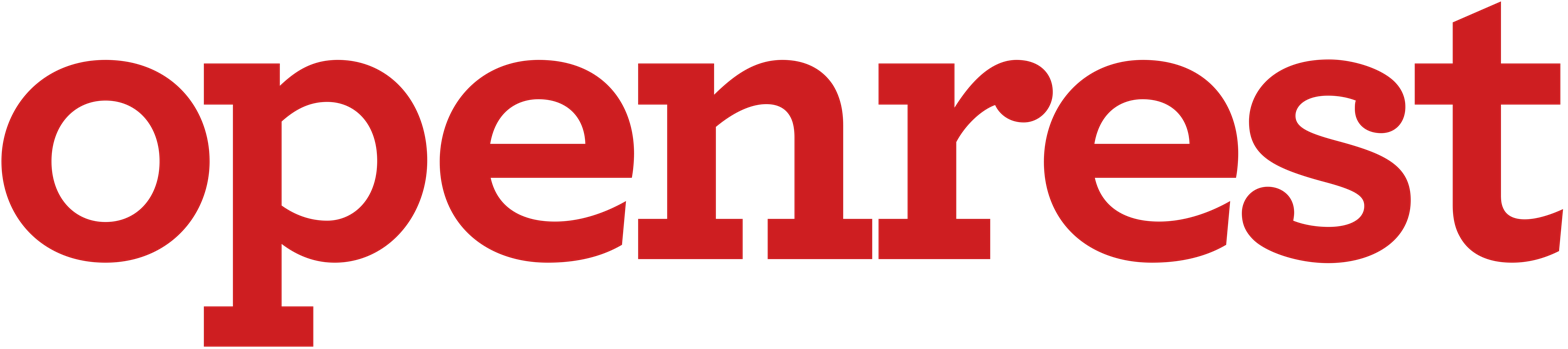
- Type: Subsidiary
- Industry: Online food ordering
- Founded: 2010
- Founder: Danny Leshem; Yoav Amit
- Headquarters: United States, Delaware
- Parent: Wix.com (2014–present)
- Website: www.openrest.com

OpenRest was a software company that provided restaurant owners with online ordering websites before being acquired by Wix.com in October 2014. The company was based in Delaware with research and development offices in Tel Aviv.

== Background ==
OpenRest was founded in 2010 by Danny Leshem and Yoav Amit. The company first focused on Web applications, before shifting towards mobile development in 2011.

By 2013, 300 restaurants had launched their OpenRest-powered ordering application on the App Store. Its R&D office was based in Tel Aviv. In June 2013, OpenRest and RestCloud announced a collaboration.

In late 2013, OpenRest partnered with Bits of Gold to be the first restaurant online ordering system to provide bitcoin payments to all its clients. In June 2014, OpenRest launched in French. In July 2014, OpenRest integrated with BitPay to expand its bitcoin payment offering.

OpenRest was acquired by Wix.com in October 2014 for $12 million.

== See also ==
- Delivery Hero
- Postmates
- OrderUp
