= Ludwig Laqueur =

German ophthalmologist (1839–1909)

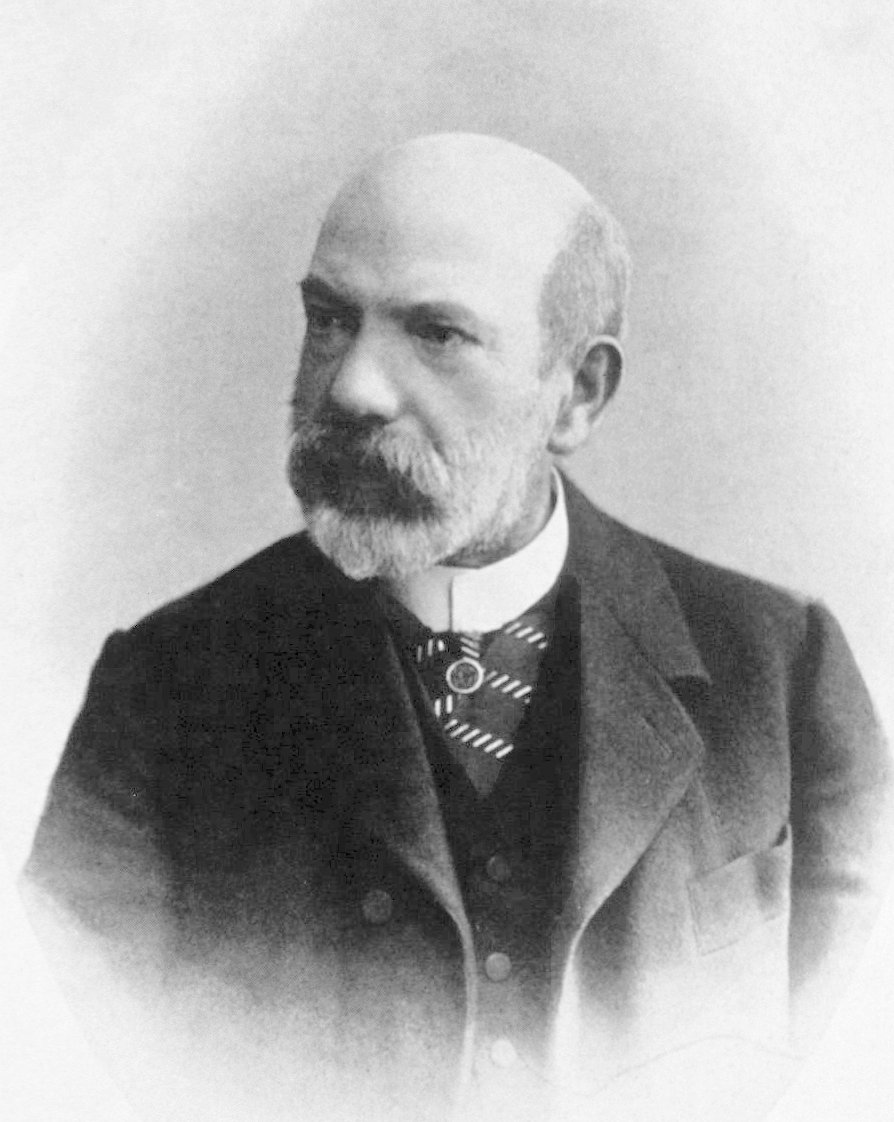
Ludwig Laqueur

Ludwig Laqueur (25 July 1839 – 20 April 1909) was a German ophthalmologist born in Festenberg, Silesia. He was the father of historian Richard Laqueur (1881–1959).

He studied medicine in Breslau and Berlin, earning his doctorate in 1860. From 1863 to 1869 he worked as an assistant at Richard Liebreich's ophthalmological hospital in Paris. In 1872 he became an associate professor at the University of Strasbourg, where in 1877 he was appointed a full professor of ophthalmology. Among his assistants at Strasbourg was Paul Silex (1858-1929).

Laqueur is remembered for his research of physostigmine, a chemical substance found in the Calabar bean (Physostigma venenosa) of West Africa. In 1876 he published Ueber eine neue therapeutische Verwendung des Physostigmin, suggesting the use of physostigmine for the treatment of glaucoma . Laqueur noticed that extracts of the Calabar bean significantly lowered intraocular pressure. He could attest to these results first-hand, because Laqueur suffered from glaucoma, a fact that was kept secret from his medical colleagues until after his death. Laqueur died in Santa Margherita Ligure on 20 April 1909.

== Written works ==
- Etudes sur les Affections Sympathiques de l'oeil, Paris, 1869
- Ueber eine neue therapeutische Verwendung des Physostigmin, 1876
- Ueber Atropin und Physostigmin in Albrecht von Graefe's Archiv für Augenheilkunde xxiii.
- Das Prodromalstadium des Glaucoms, ib. xxvi.
- Die Lage des Centrums der Macula Lutea im Menschlichen Gehirn in Rudolf Virchow's Archiv clviii.
- "Lateral Illumination" in "System of the Diseases of the Eye" edited by Norris and Oliva, Philadelphia, 1897.
