= Adobe GoLive =

WYSIWYG HTML editor and web site management application

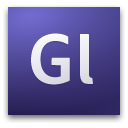

- Adobe GoLive 9 running under Mac OS X
- Developer: Adobe Systems
- Final release: 9.0 / June 1, 2007
- Written in: C++
- Operating system: Mac OS X and Microsoft Windows
- Type: HTML editor
- License: Proprietary
- Website: adobe.com/products/golive/

Adobe GoLive was a WYSIWYG HTML editor and web site management application from Adobe Systems. It replaced Adobe PageMill as Adobe's primary HTML editor and was itself discontinued in favor of Dreamweaver. The last version of GoLive that Adobe released was GoLive 9.

== History ==
GoLive originated as the flagship product of a company named GoNet Communication, Inc. then based in Menlo Park, California, and the development company GoNet Communications GmbH in Hamburg, Germany, in 1996. Later GoNet changed its name to GoLive Systems, Inc, and the name of its product to GoLive CyberStudio. Adobe acquired GoLive in 1999 and re-branded the GoLive CyberStudio product to what became Adobe GoLive. Adobe took over the Hamburg office as an Adobe development site to continue to develop the product.

At the time of the acquisition, CyberStudio was a Macintosh-only application. In the spring of 1999 Adobe released Adobe GoLive for both Macintosh and Microsoft Windows.

The first versions of Dreamweaver and CyberStudio were released in a similar timeframe. However, Dreamweaver eventually became the dominant WYSIWYG HTML editor in market share. After the Adobe acquisition of Macromedia (the company that had owned Dreamweaver), GoLive was progressively re-targeted toward Adobe's traditional design market, and the product became better integrated with Adobe's existing suite of design-oriented software products and less focused on the professional web development market.

The Adobe CS2 Premium suite contained GoLive CS2. With the release of Creative Suite 3, Adobe integrated Dreamweaver as a replacement for GoLive and released GoLive 9 as a standalone product.

In April 2008, Adobe announced that sales and development of GoLive would cease in favor of Dreamweaver.

== General description and distinctive aspects ==
GoLive incorporated a largely modeless workflow that relied heavily on drag-and-drop. Most user interaction was done via a contextual inspector rather than the modal workflow found in Dreamweaver. Among its features were a separate editor for tables that supported nesting, and a two-dimensional panel for applying CSS styles to elements. GoLive supported drag-and-drop of native Adobe Photoshop and Adobe Illustrator files via what the company called "Smart Objects", which then automatically guided the user through saving those files in web-supported formats. Updates to the original Photoshop or Illustrator assets were automatically tracked by GoLive. It also implemented a tool called "Components" which allowed updates to interface elements throughout a site to be updated globally by changing one single file. As a website management tool, GoLive allowed users to transfer and publish content directly from within the application, and allowed individual files to be excluded from uploading.

== Features ==
One of the new features of GoLive version 5 was Dynamic Link, which was a method of creating dynamic, database-driven web content without the need to know a server-side language and with full WYSIWYG support in the GoLive user interface.

GoLive had a powerful set of extensibility API which could be used to add additional functionality to the product. The GoLive SDK provided interfaces which allowed developers to use a combination of XML, JavaScript and C/C++ to create plugins for the product. The extensibility API allowed developers access to custom drawing and event handling using JavaScript, as well as a full JavaScript debugger and command line interpreter. This allowed intermediate-level developers using interpreted JavaScript to create sophisticated user interfaces.

== Language and framework structure ==
Adobe GoLive is coded in the C++ programming language. It uses a custom C++ framework called SCL (Simple Class Library) which was initially built from scratch by the engineers at GoLive Systems Inc. The SCL framework was also used in the short-lived Adobe Atmosphere 3D software.

== Release history ==
Version	Code name	Supported platforms	Release date
GoLive 1.0		Classic Mac OS	June 1996
GoLive 1.1 Pro		Classic Mac OS	August 1996
GoLive CyberStudio 1		Classic Mac OS	April 1997
GoLive CyberStudio 2		Classic Mac OS	September 1997
GoLive CyberStudio 3		Classic Mac OS	April 1998
Adobe GoLive 4		Classic Mac OS	January 1999
Adobe GoLive 4		Microsoft Windows	May 1999
Adobe GoLive 5	The Fifth Element	Classic Mac OS, Microsoft Windows	August 2000
Adobe GoLive 6	The 6th Day	Classic Mac OS, Mac OS X, Microsoft Windows	February 2002
Adobe GoLive 7 CS	Se7en	Mac OS X, Microsoft Windows	October 2003
Adobe GoLive 8 CS2	Reloaded	Mac OS X, Microsoft Windows	April 2005
Adobe GoLive 9	Vicious	Universal Mac OS X, Microsoft Windows	June 2007

As the final version, GoLive 9 was discontinued in April 2008.

== See also ==
- Comparison of HTML editors
- List of HTML editors
