= Gérard López =

Luxembourgish-Spanish businessman

- Born: Gérard López Fojaca; 27 December 1971 (age 54); Esch-sur-Alzette, Luxembourg
- Citizenship: Luxembourg and Spain
- Education: Miami University - Management and Technology
- Alma mater: Miami University
- Occupations: Chairman and co-founder, Genii Capital; Chairman and founder, The Lydian Group; Co-founder and owner Mangrove Capital Partners

Gérard López Fojaca (born 27 December 1971) is a Luxembourgish-Spanish businessman active in technology, energy, and sport. He is the co-founder (with Eric Lux) and chairman of Genii Capital. From 2009 to 2015, López was president of the Lotus F1 Team. In 2022, he launched The Lydian Group, a tech conglomerate operating across the digital assets space. In 2000, he co-founded Mangrove Capital Partners. He has previously owned multiple football clubs.

== Early life ==
López grew up in a soot-covered house next to a steel mill in Luxembourg. He was recruited to Miami University in Western Ohio to play basketball on a partial scholarship in 1998. He studied management and technology there. He also has a degree in Asian Art.

== Career ==
While at university, he founded Icon Solutions, a web services company.

With Mark Tluszcz and Hans Jurgen Schmitz, he founded Mangrove Capital Partners, a Luxembourg-based leading venture capital company specialized in future oriented technologies. Mangrove Capital Partners was one of the first investors in Skype selling a minority position to eBay in 2005 as part of the $2.6 billion acquisition.

He founded with Eric Lux in 2008 Genii Capital, a finance consulting and investment managing firm. López sits on the board of Directors of WIx, Zink Imaging, Lotus F1 Team and is also a member of the Planning Advisory Committee of the Miami University Business School.

In 2015, he founded Nekton, an investment company and brokerage in energy field, active in South America, Africa, Asia and Eastern Europe. He is also the CEO of the company.

López was formerly chairman of RISE Capital AB, which alongside Nekton, was a co-owner of RISE Capital AB Projects. Nekton divested itself of its interests in RISE in December 2020.

Some of López's companies were said to have featured in the Panama Papers leak in 2016, however the International Consortium of Investigative Journalists released a statement to say: "No wrongdoing is being alleged by the ICIJ: 'There are legitimate uses for offshore companies and trusts. We do not intend to suggest or imply that any people, companies or other entities included in the ICIJ Offshore Leaks Database have broken the law or otherwise acted improperly,'” when discussing the Bahamas Papers.

In 2022, López and his business partner, Greg Fishman, launched The Lydian Group, a tech conglomerate operating across the digital assets space. The advisory board includes Mark Tluszcz and Andrea Rossi, the former CEO of AXA Investment Managers.

== Sports ==
As a huge sports fan, López got into car racing via Eric Lux and Gravity Sport Management. He also participated in long-distance races with Gravity Racing International's team. In 2009, he bought a majority stake in the Formula 1 Renault F1 Team, making Genii Capital the majority owner of the team. While it possessed very few sponsors at the beginning, Microsoft, Unilever and Coca-Cola soon became team partners.

With Kick Partners and Mangrove Sport Business Intelligence, López takes care of the public image and the transfers of football players.

In October 2016, López entered into exclusive talks with President Michel Seydoux for the acquisition of the Lille OSC football club, which he purchased and later sold. López acquired Bordeaux in June 2021. In Portugal, he owned Boavista from 2021 until 2026, a nationally renowned sports club from Porto.

Under his ownership, both Girondins de Bordeaux and Boavista, as well as Royal Excel Mouscron in Belgium, have been relegated from the top division of their respective leagues into the 4th and 5th tiers of amateur football. On 31 May 2022, Royal Excel Mouscron filed for bankruptcy.

In mid-July 2026, Girondins de Bordeaux was relegated from the national championships to Régional 1, the sixth tier in French football, due to financial difficulties and failure to meet financial requirements. On 31 July, López sold Bordeaux to British investment firm Sparta Capital Management for a symbolic one euro, after the firm secured the required €10 million to complete a takeover of the club. Bordeaux subsequently sought for reinstatement to the Championnat National 2 through an appeal to the CNOSF.

== Political donations ==
In August 2016, it was reported that López had given the British Conservative Party £400,000, in support of his friend Zac Goldsmith as a candidate in the mayoral election at the time.

== Personal life ==
López owns a car collection and it has been featured in Top Gear magazine and in local newspapers.
