= Royal Excel Mouscron =

Belgian professional football club

- Full name: Royal Excel Mouscron
- Nickname: Les Hurlus
- Short name: REM
- Founded: 1922; 104 years ago (as RC Péruwelz)
- Dissolved: 2022; 4 years ago
- Ground: Stade Le Canonnier
- Capacity: 10,800
- Owner: Gérard López
- Chairman: Patrick Declerck
- Final season; 2021–22: 7th of 8 (folded)
Home colours	Away colours	Third colours

Royal Excel Mouscron (French pronunciation: [mukʁɔ̃], Dutch pronunciation: [muˈskrun]), commonly known as Mouscron or familiarly as REM, was a Belgian professional football club based in Mouscron.

The team was formed as Royal Mouscron-Péruwelz in the spring of 2010 as a result of the merging between bankrupt R.E. Mouscron and R.R.C. Peruwelz. It won promotion to the Belgian Pro League in 2014 and changed its name in the summer of 2016, being relegated in 2021 and filing for bankruptcy a year later.

The club was owned by nearby French club Lille from 2012 to 2015, and by a Maltese consortium linked to Israeli agent Pini Zahavi from 2015 to 2018, Pairoj Piempongsant of Carabao Energy Drink from 2018 to 2020, and Spanish-Luxembourgish businessman Gérard López from 2020 to 2022. The club was investigated by the Belgian federal judiciary over alleged financial offences relating to Zahavi.

== History ==
=== Foundation and promotions ===
Following the liquidation and break-up of R.E. Mouscron, whose registration number was removed by the Royal Belgian Football Association, the city of Mouscron began negotiations with leaders of R.R.C. Peruwelz about a possible merge. After weeks of hesitation and uncertainty, an agreement was reached. The agreement was officially signed and announced on 11 March 2010. Debts of about €100,000 in R.R.C. Peruwelz's name were cleared while the city agreed to maintain the training center known as "Futurosport". The newly merged club, Royal Mouscron-Péruwelz, took on the history of R.R.C. Peruwelz, receiving matricule number 216 and keeping red and blue as its main colors.

In its first season, it participated in Belgian Promotion A, the 4th level of Belgian football. They were promoted to the Belgian Third Division for the 2011–12 season, playing in Division A, while reaching Round 6 of the 2011–12 Belgian Cup before losing to Belgian Pro League club Beerschot on penalties 4–3. They finished first in their division in league play, and thus were promoted to the Belgian Second Division. The next season Mouscron-Péruwelz finished 2nd and qualified for the promotion play-offs but lost; in the cup, they reached Round 6 again, losing 3–2 after extra time to Standard Liège.

In 2013–14, Royal Mouscron-Péruwelz came fourth and made the playoffs, where they won promotion on the final day with a 4–2 win at Sint-Truidense, while Eupen lost 2–1 against OH Leuven. The result restored top-flight football to the city of Mouscron, four years after the decline of Royal Excelsior Mouscron.

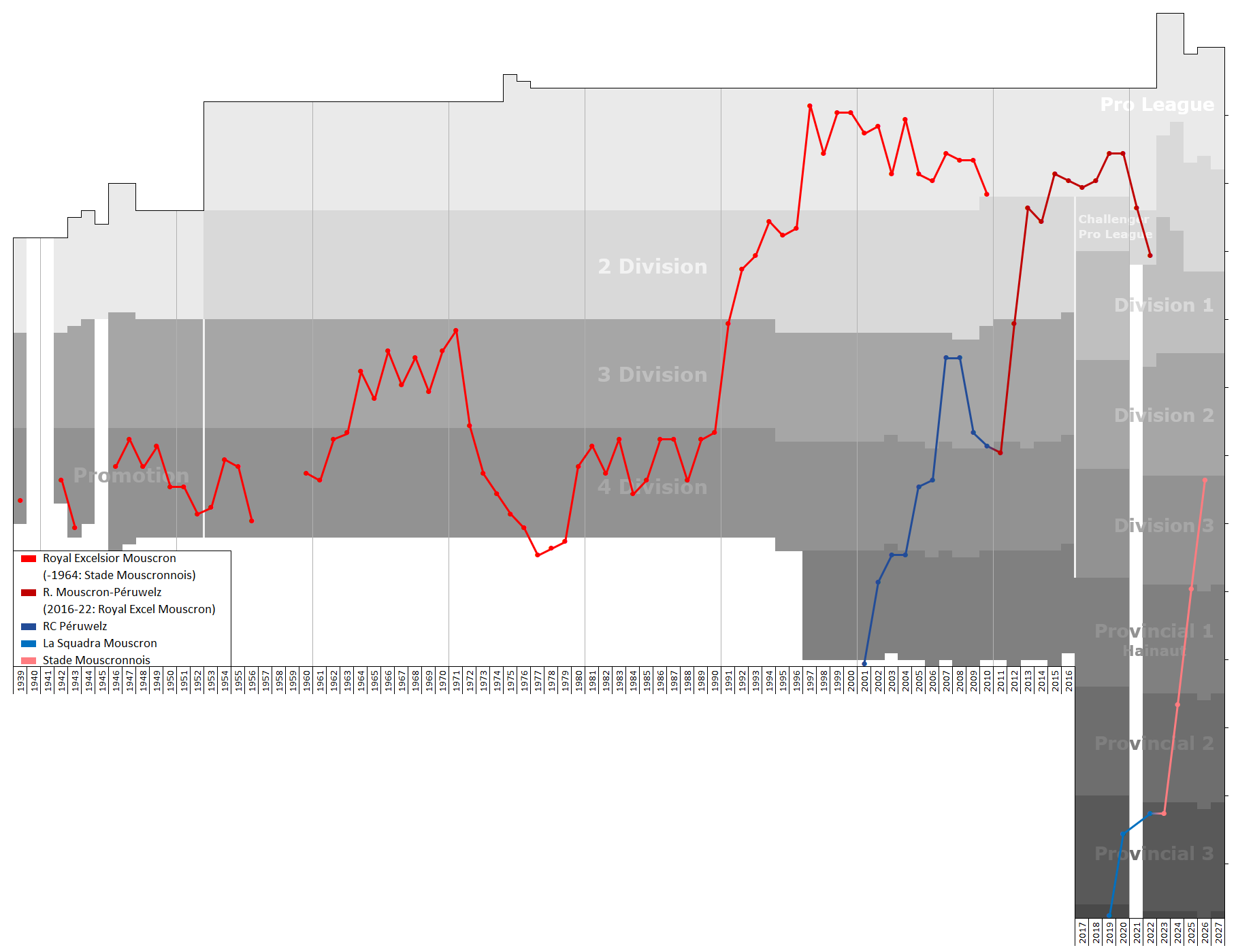
Historical chart of league performance of Royal Excel Mouscron, its predecessors and successors

=== Top-flight years and dissolution ===
Former Leeds United player Aaron Ward has expressed his interest in taking back over the club and helping it climb back up the divisions, claiming that he was going to make the club a Belgian ‘powerhouse’.

In 2015, after their first season in the top flight, the club saw the termination of its partnership with neighbouring French Ligue 1 club Lille, which had been the majority shareholder for the past three years. This was because Belgian businessman Marc Coucke had invested in Lille while being owner of Belgian top-flight team KVO, and could not own interests in two teams in the same league.

After the separation from Lille in 2015, the club was bought by a Maltese company involving Israeli agent Pini Zahavi, then transferred to another Maltese consortium controlled by his nephew Adar, to avoid FIFA's rules on agents owning clubs.

The club had its best finish in the Belgian Cup in the 2015–16 season, making the quarter-finals before a 2–1 loss at Genk. In June 2016, the club changed its name to Royal Excel Mouscron, which it would remain until its bankruptcy.

In March 2018, Thai businessman Pairoj Piempongsant of the Carabao Energy Drink bought 90% of the club's shares, with 10% remaining in local hands. Eleven months later, the club was put in administration by the Belgian federal judiciary, due to alleged money laundering by Pini Zahavi. In June 2019, a court in Mons ordered the club to restore the name Péruwelz due to an agreement between the two united clubs and the possession of that club's matricule number; the two clubs agreed not to restore the name.

Spanish-Luxembourgish businessman Gérard López took over the club in May 2020, restoring its partnership with Lille, another one of his properties. He was ousted from Lille in December 2020. The club's seven-year stay in the top flight ended with relegation in 2020–21. In June 2021, former Belgium international Enzo Scifo was bought in as manager with Mbo Mpenza as director of football and his brother Émile Mpenza as Scifo's assistant, but all three were dismissed in October.

In May 2022, the club were relegated two tiers to the fourth, after being refused a professional licence due to financial irregularities and a debt of around €10 million. On 31 May, the club filed for bankruptcy.
