= Webnode =

Web development platform

- Developer: Webnode AG
- Release: 2008
- Type: Website builder, Web hosting
- License: Commercial
- Website: webnode.com

Webnode (/ˈwɛbnoʊd/) is a cloud-based website builder that allows individuals and organizations to create and manage websites using a web-based editor, without the need to install or configure additional software. The platform uses a visual drag-and-drop interface and supports the creation of websites that adapt to different screen sizes and without requiring programming knowledge.

Webnode is used for creating a variety of websites, including personal sites, blogs, portfolios, business websites, and online stores, and is commonly adopted by individuals, freelancers, and small businesses.

== History ==
Webnode AG was founded in 2008 by Vít Vrba and Ondřej Kratěna. Its legal headquarters are in Zurich, Switzerland, while the development and operations centers are based in Brno, Czech Republic.

Webnode started with its Czech launch and was followed by the Slovak version in early June. In February 2016, Webnode CZ reported that its service had over 22 million users worldwide and publicly stated ambitions to expand its user base further. By 2023, 45 million websites were created using Webnode.

In 2015, the company released Webnode 2.0, an update to the original CMS architecture. In 2020, Webnode became part of team.blue, a digital service provider headquartered in Ghent, Belgium.

== Business model ==
Webnode operates on a freemium model, providing a free version with basic website creation functionality and a range of paid subscription plans. Paid plans include additional functionality, such as custom domains, increased storage, and support for e-commerce and multilingual websites.

The freemium structure allows individuals, freelancers, and small businesses to create and publish websites without upfront costs, while paid plans provide access to these additional features.

== Features ==
The platform provides, AI website builder, SEO tools, automated website migration, multilingual support and responsive design for mobile devices.

== Ratings and reviews ==
Platform	Rating	Author	Date
WebsiteBuilder	8.0 / 10	Laura M.	January 01, 2026
Tooltester	3.9 / 5	Robert B. Inka W.	September 15, 2025
Expert	7.9 / 10	Martin Gschwentner	January 6, 2025
TechRadar	4.0 / 5	Chyelle Dvorak	November 18, 2020
