= Paul Silex =

German ophthalmologist (1858–1929)

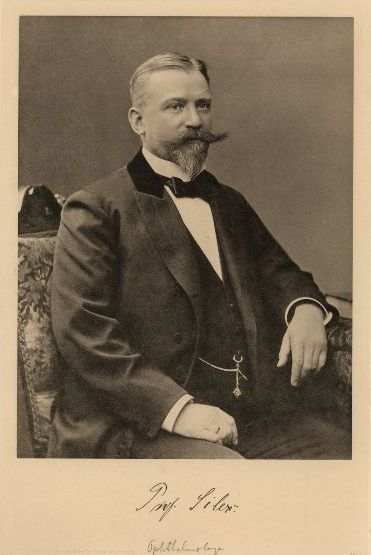
Paul Silex (1858-1929)

Paul Silex (20 March 1858, Gorgast – 20 January 1929, Berlin) was a German ophthalmologist. He is known for contributions made involving war-related blindness.

He studied medicine at the Universities of Halle, Berlin and Breslau, obtaining his doctorate in 1883. Afterwards he served as an assistant to ophthalmologist Ludwig Laqueur (1839-1909) in Strasbourg, followed by several years (1884-1897) as an assistant to Karl Ernst Theodor Schweigger (1830-1905) in Berlin.

He received his habilitation in 1890, becoming an associate professor in 1897. In Berlin he opened a private clinic at St. Maria Victoria-Krankenhaus.

== Associated eponym ==
- "Silex's sign": A pathognomonic sign of congenital syphilis, indications being radial furrows about the mouth.

== Selected writings ==
- Compendium der Augenheilkunde, 1899 - Compendium of ophthalmology; (published over several editions).
- Über das Sehvermögen der Eisenbahnbeamten, 1894 - On the vision of railway officials.
- Neue Wege in der Kriegsblindenfürsorge, 1916 - New approaches to war-blind welfare.
