= Mark Tluszcz =

American technology investor (born 1966)

- Born: August 18, 1966 (age 60)
- Education: Eckerd College, St Petersburg, Florida
- Occupation: Venture capitalist
- Known for: Early investor in Skype and Wix.com

Mark Tluszcz is an American businessman and venture capitalist who is co-founder and CEO of Mangrove Capital Partners, a venture capital firm he set up in 2000. He also serves as chairman of Wix.com (NASDAQ:WIX), a website building platform. His $2 million investment in Skype yielded $200 million and a $8 million investment in Wix.com yielded $700 million.

== Career ==
Tluszcz spent the first ten years of his professional career at Arthur Andersen, ultimately becoming a partner in its business consulting practice before running its European venture capital fund. During this time he personally invested in a number of businesses including the Frederick Brewing Company which listed on the NASDAQ stock exchange.

In 2000, he founded Mangrove Capital Partners with Gerard Lopez and Hans-Jürgen Schmitz. He was the first investor in Skype, a telecom business founded by Janus Friis and Niklas Zennström - who were at the time known for founding Kazaa, the peer-to-peer file sharing application. On 14 October 2005 Skype was acquired by eBay and Tluszcz was named as one of the most respected technology dealmakers globally by Forbes magazine.

In 2006, Tluszcz backed cloud-based web development platform Wix.com. He persuaded Wix.com not to sell when it was offered $400 million and the company went on to float on NASDAQ in 2013. Its market capitalisation reached $5 billion in 2018. It remains the largest tech IPO to come out of Israel.

Tluszcz's firm looks at 2,000 startup deals a year but invests in just six. It has made approximately 100 investments into early-stage technology companies predominantly in Europe and Israel since it was founded in 2000. The company has raised four funds and has $750 million in assets under management. In 2016, it had seven or eight startups in its portfolio experiencing rapid growth and worth over $100 million.

Tluszcz is on the advisory board of the Lydian Group, a tech conglomerate (company) founded by Gérard López and Greg Fishman.

=== Stances and views ===
In April 2015, Tluszcz stated that the majority of "unicorn" companies (those reporting to be worth over $1 billion) were in fact "fakies". Later in the year, the technology industry experienced a significant correction with many highly prized companies seeing their values slashed. Having been valued at over $1 billion in 2015, Shazam was acquired by Apple in 2017 in a deal thought to be worth $400 million.

In April 2016, amid growing excitement in the fintech sector, Tluszcz wrote about a "fintech mirage" in an article published by the Financial Times which advised investors to ignore the hype about fintech, called for greater regulation, and raised concerns about the peer-to-peer lending sector. Weeks later, peer-to-peer lending platform Lending Club revealed on its earnings call that the CEO, Renaud Laplanche, had been removed for unethical behaviour. The company's stock crashed 50%, seeing its market capitalization fall by $1.5 billion over the following two weeks. He also predicted that app-only banks may struggle to gain the trust of consumers and grow their customer base.

Tluszcz has also expressed doubts over the business models of gig economy companies such as Uber and Deliveroo, which have been accused of not paying adequate wages and taxes. He predicted these businesses will have to go through massive structural changes driven by individual countries' laws. When Deliveroo listed on the stock market in 2021 it fell 26% and was referred to bankers as the "worst IPO in London's history".
