= Business School Lausanne =

Private business school in Lausanne, Switzerland

Business School Lausanne (BSL)
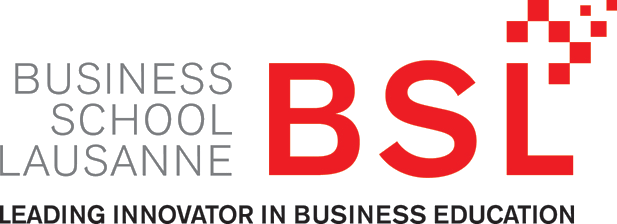
- Motto: Leading Innovator in Business Education
- Type: Private business school
- Established: 1987
- Founders: John Hobbs
- President: Philippe Du Pasquier
- Dean: David Claivaz
- Director: Philippe Du Pasquier
- Academic staff: 50
- Students: 160+
- Location: Chavannes, Switzerland; 46.5278°N 6.5731°E
- Campus: Chavannes, Switzerland
- Website: www.bsl-lausanne.ch

Business School Lausanne (BSL) is a private business school located in Lausanne, Switzerland. It is part of the Lemania Group of Swiss Private Schools.

== History ==
BSL was founded in 1987 by Dr. John Hobbs. The current President is Philippe Du Pasquier and the Acting Dean is Dr. David Claivaz. The faculty consists of 50 professors.

== Degree programs ==
BSL offers private degree programs undergraduate, graduate, and doctoral programs with emphasis on sustainability.

The BSL Bachelor of Business Administration (BBA) program provides undergraduates with a foundation in all areas of business. BSL offers a master's degree: a Master of International Business. The program offers three concentrations: Entrepreneurial Leadership, Finance and Sustainability. A Capstone Project is a substantial part of this program offering a number of study options, including an Applied Business Project, Internship, Masters Thesis (with optional exchange option with China), and a CFA Level I Preparation.

The BSL MBA & Executive MBA curriculum comprise a range of required core courses (foundation part) and electives (integration part). The core courses cover traditional management disciplines including finance, organizational behavior, marketing, corporate strategy, operations management, sustainability, entrepreneurship, and leadership development modules in self-management, communication and cooperation skills, and managing and developing others.

BSL offers a Doctorate of Business Administration (DBA) program. The BSL DBA is a three-year part-time program for experienced business professionals or teaching scholars interested in research in the domain of business sustainability.

The BSL Diploma of Sustainable Business is a six-month, part-time executive program that includes not only subject knowledge in the field of sustainable business but also leading change and project management experience as part of the course.

It also offers Master of International Business (MIB).

== Accreditations & certifications ==
BSL's programs are accredited by the programmatic private agency Accreditation Council for Business Schools and Programs (ACBSP) since 1996.

== Rankings ==
- BSL ranks #2 in Global DBA Rankings Euro 2022 published by the European Economic Committee for its Doctorate of Business Administration program.
- BSL ranks #2 in Switzerland for its Master of International Business (MIB) and #4 for its Master of Business Administration (MBA) in the QS Global Business Masters and MBA Rankings 2019.
- BSL ranks third in Switzerland and 28th in Europe in the QS Global 200 Business Schools Report 2014-15.
- BSL ranked 50th in Europe in the QS Global 200 Business Schools Report 2012/13, and 48th in Europe in the 2013/2014 Europe QS ranking.

== Memberships ==
BSL is a member of the Swiss Federation of Private Schools as well as the European Foundation for Management Development (EFMD). BSL is signatory of the Principles for Responsible Management Education PRME. BSL has committed to the Ten Principles of the United Nations Global Compact since 2006 and is an associate member of the Swiss local network. BSL is the co-founder of the 50+20 initiative on Management Education for the World. It is also a member of Association to Advance Collegiate Schools of Business, Association of MBAs and Business Graduates Association, and European Foundation for Management Development.
