= Vinny Lingham =

South African Internet entrepreneur (born 1979)

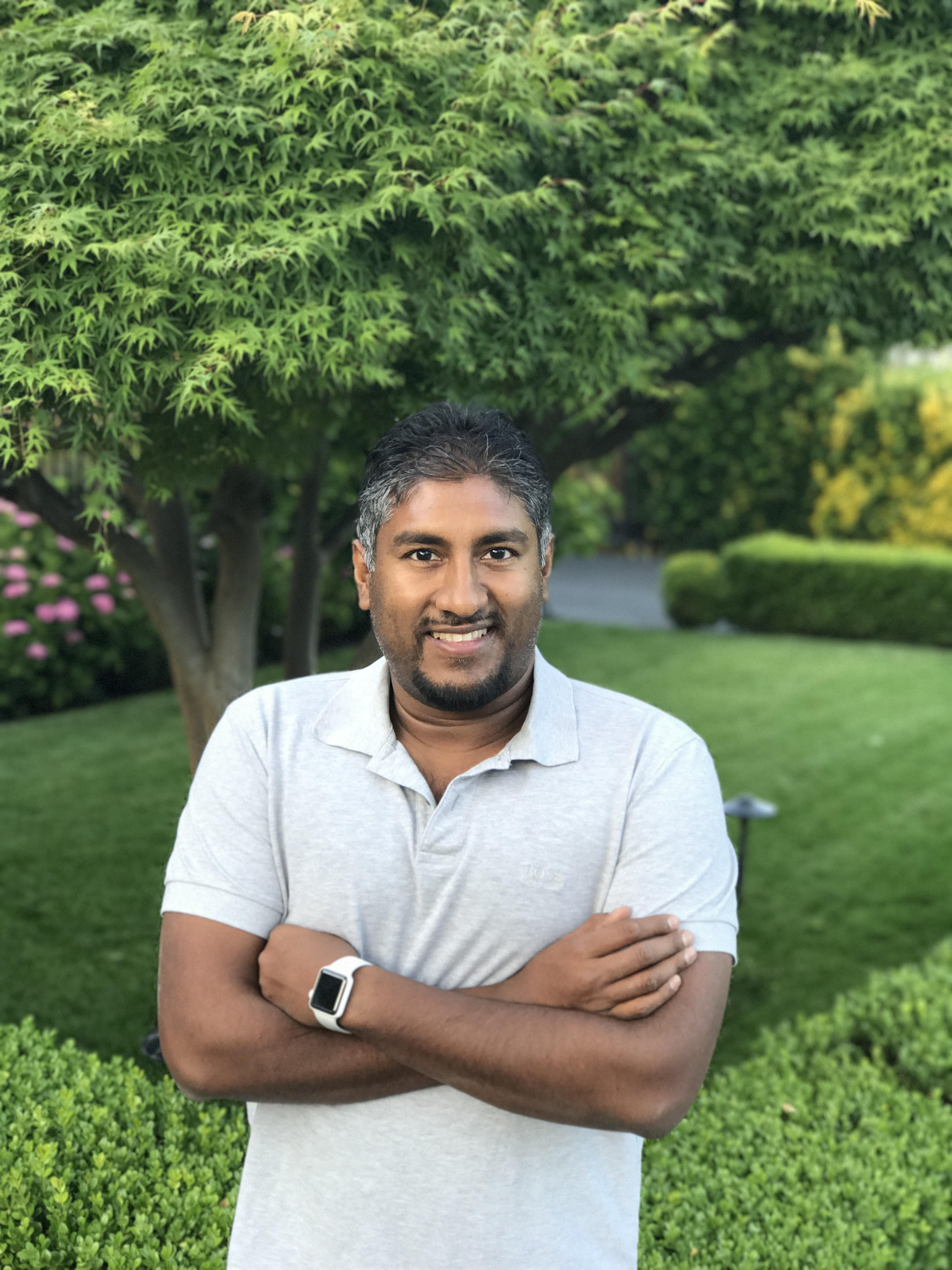
- Born: 7 February 1979 (age 47); East London, Eastern Cape, South Africa
- Education: Hudson Park High School; University of South Africa; Gordon Institute of Business Science; Damelin
- Occupations: Entrepreneur and Technology Investor
- Title: Co-Founder and GP Member of Praxos Capital (2024-present) Founder and Chairman of Rumi.ai (2020-present) Co-Founder and Chairman of Civic (2015–present)
- Board member of: Bitcoin Foundation (the foundation dissolved in 2015)
- Awards: World Economic Forum Young Global Leaders (2009), Top Young ICT Entrepreneur in Africa Award (2006), Endeavor High Impact Entrepreneur (2006)

Vinny Lingham (born February 7, 1979) is an entrepreneur and technology investor renowned for his significant contributions to the cryptocurrency and blockchain industries. He is best known for his early investments in major blockchain projects such as Solana, Filecoin, and Render, as well as his role as a General Partner at Multicoin Capital from 2017 to 2020. In 2024, he co-founded Praxos Capital, a cryptocurrency money market hedge fund.

== Early life and education ==
Lingham was born and raised in East London, South Africa. He attended Hudson Park High School in East London. He matriculated to the University of Cape Town but did not complete his degree, instead dropping out in 1999. In 2001 he received an e-Commerce degree from the University of South Africa.

== Career ==
Lingham’s career in technology began in 2003 when he founded incuBeta, an incubator and investment firm that grew into a large enterprise focused on digital marketing and technology solutions. That same year, he co-founded Clicks2Customers, a subsidiary specializing in search engine marketing, which expanded internationally. In 2023, incuBeta was sold to The Carlyle Group, marking a significant milestone in its evolution.

In 2007, Lingham launched Yola (formerly SynthaSite), a platform enabling users to build websites without coding skills. Yola secured substantial venture funding and served millions of users before he shifted focus to new ventures.

Lingham entered the cryptocurrency space in 2012 by co-founding Gyft, a mobile gift card platform notable for its early adoption of Bitcoin payments. Gyft was acquired by First Data Corporation in 2014 for an estimated $54 million.

From 2017 to 2020, Lingham served as a General Partner at Multicoin Capital, a prominent crypto investment firm. During this period, he led the seed investment round for Solana—a high-performance blockchain platform—and served as an advisor to the project. His investment portfolio also included early stakes in Filecoin, a decentralized storage network, and Render, a blockchain-based rendering platform, solidifying his reputation as a key investor in transformative blockchain technologies.

In 2015, Lingham co-founded Civic, a blockchain-based identity verification platform, where he served as CEO until transitioning to other projects. (He currently holds positions as Chairman of Civic Technologies and Rumi.ai, an AI platform focused on capturing valuable information from client calls and interactions.)

== Other Activities ==
Lingham is an angel investor and mentor to startups across the tech and crypto landscapes. He appeared as a “Dragon” on the South African edition of Dragon’s Den in 2015 and later became a Shark on Shark Tank South Africa, offering investment and guidance to entrepreneurs.

== Personal life ==
Lingham resides in Austin, Texas, and holds dual South African and U.S. citizenship. He remains active in the global tech and crypto communities.

== Recognition ==
Lingham’s influence in cryptocurrency and blockchain has earned him coverage in outlets like Forbes, The Wall Street Journal, and TechCrunch. Often dubbed the “Bitcoin Oracle" for his market insights, he is recognized as a pivotal figure in shaping the early cryptocurrency investment landscape.

== Awards ==
Lingham's industry accolades include:

- Crypto Weekly: The 100 Most Influential People In Crypto, 2024
- Top 500 CEO's in the World, 2015
- World Economic Forum Young Global Leaders, 2009
- Endeavor High Impact Entrepreneur, 2006
- Top Young ICT Entrepreneur in Africa Award, 2006
