= EMobc =

Framework

eMobc is an open source framework for generation of web, mobile web and native IOS and Android apps develop mobile applications quickly and easily using XML. eMobc Framework is developed by Neurowork Consulting S.L. and was introduced in November 2012. eMobc currently supports the following platforms IOS, Android, and HML5. In the future is to add other platforms as BlackBerry or Windows Phone.

All the framework is published under the Affero GPLv3 license. Developers also can donate their code and integrate it with the eMobc framework.

Moreover, eMobc is the first framework with job board where developers can register and collaborate on client projects.

== Overview ==
Included in the framework is support for 19 types of screens, with text, forms, maps, calendars, and more, for building applications. Various themes and styles are also supported so the appearance of each screen can be customized. Navigation created with eMobc can be configured with top, bottom, and sidebar menus. The framework also allows for screen rotation, text to speech, and social network sharing.

In addition, various formats support smartphones and tablets. Any components developed with the platform can be done so in the desired language. Numerous possibilities are provided for screens, including splash screens, a cover for the application with buttons, photo galleries, PDF viewing, lists, videos, and geolocation maps. Users can also add search, form, image with text, zoom, quiz, and canvas functions.

eMobc's Cloud platform was set up to create mobile web and landing pages. The eMobc Cloud's advantages include its ability to mix with outer administrations; its expanded structure, allowing it to interact consistently across devices; and both an online and offline mode.
