= Vanity domain =

Type of domain name

In the Domain Name System (DNS), a vanity domain is a domain name whose purpose is to express the individuality of the person on whose behalf it is registered. This contrasts with domain names which resolve to an organisation (e.g. a company) or a service that organisation offers. Vanity domains may be compared with vanity car registration plates, which similarly identify their owner as an individual and not just someone relying on another organisation's services.

A subdomain of an ISP's domain that is aliased to an individual user account is a vanity domain. Other definitions include:

- the Free On-line Dictionary of Computing defines it as "A domain you register for the sole purpose of having your own domain so you can have an easily remembered URL and e-mail address",
- while the Jargon File defines it as "An Internet domain, particularly in the .com or .org top-level domains, apparently created for no reason other than boosting the creator's ego."
- The Sun iPlanet Messaging Server uses msgVanityDomain to set up a domain name for e-mail use which is not fully hosted.

These uses apply primarily to regular domain names registered at the highest allowed level rather than subdomains (although, technically speaking, a second-level domain is actually a subdomain of its top-level domain).

Because vanity domains are operated for or on behalf of individuals, they typically will not offer the full complement of services an organisational domain name (or rather, the host that it points to) would be expected to honour; for example, the DNS record may contain only an MX record identifying a mail server accepting e-mail for that domain (which may itself be an e-mail forwarding server) and an A record identifying a shared web hosting service only offering HTTP (which may itself be a URL redirection service).

As well as being easily remembered, vanity domains (especially when registered at the highest level allowed by the registrar) offer the advantage of personal mobility; they continue to be associated with a person even when that person switches service providers.

== Use of top-level domains ==
A top-level domain does not refer to the cost of a website domain. It means how appropriate your domain is for your website or website topic. A top-level domain can become part of a vanity URL. Taking advantage of countries that do not ask for proof of residence to register their country-specific TLDs (Top Level Domains) can allow a user to incorporate the two or three letters following the dot, using them to help spell out the desired name, word or phrase.

== See also ==
- Domain hack
- Vanity number
