= Silex (website builder) =

Open-source website builder software

- Developers: Alexandre Hoyau, Pierre Teissière, Pol Goasdoué, founders
- Stable release: v2.7.30 / April 19, 2023; 2 years ago
- Repository: github.com/silexlabs/Silex
- Operating system: Web app, Windows, macOS, Linux
- Type: Website builder
- License: AGPL
- Website: www.silex.me

Silex is a free WYSIWYG website builder, that can be used directly in a browser or run offline as a it also provides cross-platform application version. The application includes a drag and drop interface to edit a website, and HTML, CSS and JavaScript editors to add styles and interactivity to the elements.

== History ==
- Founded in 2003 by Alex Hoyau, Pol Goasdoué and Pierre Teissière. The project is oriented towards video and cross media.
- In 2005, the version v0-6 is presented at the WWDC2005 in Cupertino California. Apple is interested in Flash capacity to compete with their QuickTime plug-in. Macromedia has just been acquired by Adobe, Apple's main partner.
- In 2006, the program was presented in several conferences at La Villette and won a challenge organized by Dauphine high school with INRIA - French National institute for research in computer science and control. The program at this time was mainly used for freelancers small projects.
- In 2007, Silex source code officially released as open source
- In 2008, Silex was among the 100 first Open Source projects on SourceForge. Silex v1 is released.
- In 2009, Silex was project of the month on SourceForge. The program was presented Silex at several French conference: Futur en Seine, Les Trophées du Libre, Pas sage en Seine, Wikiplaza
- In 2010, the team members formalized their cooperation by creating a non profit organization for promotion, deployment support, and development of open source software projects related to Silex and Open Source Flash. The organization became the official maintainer of AMFPHP, a mature communautary project.
- In 2012, Silex has reached the 100.000 downloads. And the team has made a dedicated version for HTML, the html5 editor, which was downloaded 1000 times on the first month.
- In 2013, the team, led by Alex Hoyau started from scratch and build Silex V2 with Javascript, Node.js and more modern technologies than the previous version.
- In 2016, Silex Labs foundation has set up a crowd funding campaign to give Silex international concern by creating a multilingual documentation and tutorials, and to create free templates to facilitate the creation of a website, and to develop a "responsive editor" to make it possible to optimize the mobile version of websites.

== Features ==
- WYSIWYG environment to edit a publication with drag and drop
- HTML, CSS and Javascript code editors included
- Suitable for prototyping
- Web based (can be installed locally on a web server) or as a portable offline app
- Free templates and plugins
- File browser integration with GitHub, Dropbox, FTP, WebDAV, and SFTP
- Easy options for responsive element design
- Easy switch between desktop and mobile view
