= Weebly =

Web hosting service

- Weebly's page and website editor
- Website type: Web hosting service
- Founded: March 29, 2006; 20 years ago (Beta)
- Founders: David Rusenko; Dan Veltri; Chris Fanini
- Parent: Block, Inc.
- Website: weebly.com

Weebly, a subsidiary of Block, Inc., is an American web hosting and web development company based in San Francisco, California. Founded in 2006 by David Rusenko, Chris Fanini, and Dan Veltri, the company offers WYSIWYG website creation services and hosting. David Rusenko served as the Chief Executive Officer, Chris Fanini as the Chief Technology Officer, and Dan Veltri as the Chief Product Officer.

== History ==
The company was established to simplify the process of building personal websites. In early 2006, Rusenko began development of Weebly in his college dorm at the Pennsylvania State University where he met Chris Fanini. By June 2006, an invitational beta version was introduced, followed by the official launch of a private beta in September 2006. Before its acquisition by Block in 2018, Weebly had raised approximately $35 million in funding from a range of investors, including angel investors and venture capital firms. In 2018, co-founder Dan Veltri departed from the company.

In March 2007, Weebly re-launched with its WYSIWYG editing interface, "Pro" accounts and Google AdSense monetization features, as well as compatibility with Google Chrome and Safari. In 2010, the company added French, Italian, Spanish, and Chinese languages followed by integrated JotForm software into its services. On October 1, 2015, Weebly Carbon was released to allow plugin integration among other features. In 2016, Weebly began focusing on its e-commerce offerings with the release of Weebly 4 and Weebly Promote, an integrated marketing tool.

As more sellers began using the company, the company created features for doing taxes, integrations with Shippo, a Facebook Ad creator, email marketing and lead capture, abandoned cart features, the release of Mobile 5.0 to help sellers run their store from anywhere, and deep integrations with Square payment processing.

Weebly initially faced criticism for its lack of CSS/HTML editing support, but this functionality was added in 2009.

The company expanded its offices in 2015, including a 36,000-square-foot (3,300 m^{2}) warehouse in San Francisco. In October 2015, Weebly set up a Berlin-based support team serving customers in the United Kingdom, France and Germany.

In 2018, Weebly was acquired by Square, Inc. (now known as Block, Inc.) for approximately $365 million in cash and stock. At the time of the acquisition on June 4, 2018, Weebly had millions of customers and over 625,000 paid subscribers. As of September 2026, Weebly is used by appoximately 0.4% of all websites, representing about 0.6% of websites whose content management system is known.

In 20 June 2026, Weebly announced they were ceasing operations in 67 countries by the end of the year due to changes in regulations and to simplify their global operations. Users in the affected countries could no longer publish their pages after June 29, 2026. Existing websites were scheduled to be unpublished on September 27, while account access would reain available until December 26, 2026, to allow users to retrieve data and transfer websites and domains. An analysis of Builtwith country-level data identified at least 4,368 active Webly websites across 58 of the 67 affected markets for which data was available.

== Product ==
Weebly's website creator operates in a web browser, using a widget-based site builder with drag-and-drop functionality. Storage is unlimited, but the service restricts individual file sizes. It automatically generates a mobile version of each website and supports blogging and e-commerce. Sites can be in various top-level domains, including weebly.com, com, net, org, co, info, or us.

Weebly previously offered Android and iOS apps for managing websites and online stores. The apps are no longer available for download, although they remain available to users who had them installed before December 15, 2025. Users can incorporate advertisements on their websites and track visitor statistics through Weebly's tracking tool or Google Analytics. The platform also offers integrated newsletter marketing features and supports multiple languages: English, French, Spanish, Italian, German, Portuguese, Polish, Norwegian, Dutch, Danish, Swedish, Chinese, Japanese, Russian, and Turkish (as of 2020).

== Awards and recognition ==
Weebly has received recognition for its contributions to web development, including being listed among TIME'S 50 Best Websites of 2007 and receiving mentions in Forbes and Business Insider. However, it has faced censorship in some countries and has implemented geo-blocking in several regions.

== Censorship ==
In December 2014, the Indian government blocked Weebly in India, due to fears that ISIS propaganda was being spread through the site. On December 31, the site was again made available throughout India.

Weebly also applies censorship to its availability with a wide selection of geo-blocked countries where Weebly is unavailable to internet users. Site owners are unable to log in from these geo-blocked locations to administer the site just as internet users cannot reach the site. According to Weebly's official support forum, the exact list of blocked countries is secret, but the employees confirmed the blocking of Côte d'Ivoire, Iran, Russia, Turkey, Ukraine, as well as much of the Middle East, West and Central Africa.

== See also ==
- Website builder
