= WYMeditor =

Open-source WYSIWYG text editor

- Original authors: Jean-François Hovinne, Daniel Reszka
- Release: October 7, 2005; 21 years ago
- Final release: 1.1.1 / October 30, 2015; 11 years ago
- Written in: JavaScript
- Operating system: Cross-platform
- Type: HTML editor
- License: GNU General Public License, MIT License
- Website: www.wymeditor.org
- Repository: github.com/wymeditor/wymeditor

WYMeditor is an open-source WYSIWYM text editor written in the JavaScript programming language for editing content on web pages. It is based on the jQuery JavaScript framework. It differs from other embeddable text editors such as FCKeditor and TinyMCE in that it concentrates on the semantics and meaning of content leaving out visual details. Unlike WYSIWYG editors, it explicitly shows the XHTML structure of content to the user.

Presentation and visual coherence is added using CSS which is either provided prepackaged, or can be customized.

WYMeditor is web server agnostic meaning it can be integrated into web pages built with any server side language.

Although lacking in some areas, WYMeditor statedly has more readable and cleaner source code. The opposite is often said about its competitors.
