= Jimdo =

German web hosting service

Jimdo GmbH
- Company type: Private
- Available in: German, English, French, Spanish, Japanese, Russian, Italian, Dutch
- Founded: 2007; 19 years ago
- Headquarters: Hamburg, {{{location_country}}}
- Founders: Matthias Henze; Christian Springub; Fridtjof Detzner
- Employees: 200 (2015)
- Website: www.jimdo.com
- Registration: Required
- Launched: 19 February 2007

Jimdo GmbH is a German website builder privately held and headquartered in Hamburg, Germany, with offices in Munich and Tokyo. The software is aimed at small and medium businesses, providing tools to create e-commerce websites, gather analytics and automate SEO.

== History ==
Jimdo was founded in 2007 by Matthias Henze, Christian Springub and Fridtjof Detzner.

While they were still in high school, Springub and Detzner started their first internet agency, designing websites for small businesses in Cuxhaven, Germany. When Matthias Henze joined the company in 2004, the team decided to build their own content management system, which would go on to become Jimdo in 2007.

In April 2009, after Yahoo! announced that GeoCities was closing, Jimdo announced that former GeoCities users were welcome on Jimdo. Jimdo started the "Lifeboat for GeoCities" promotion to help users transition to Jimdo. Jimdo offered a ten percent discount to users who moved from GeoCities and Google Page Creator to Jimdo.

In 2010, Jimdo added a "store" service that allows Jimdo website owners to conduct electronic commerce services. Also in 2010, United Internet withdrew from the company's board. In February 2012, the 5 millionth Jimdo site went online and in November 2013, the 10 millionth. As of July 2019, over 25 million websites have been created with Jimdo.

On June 8, 2015, Jimdo secured 25 million euros worth of investment from the American company Spectrum Equity. With this investment, Spectrum Equity now holds a share of 26.7 percent of Jimdo GmbH although the company remains privately held. In October 2016, Jimdo laid off 25% of its staff in a bid to regain focus after founders recognized that the company was getting slower at product development. Co-founder, Henze, described the decision as Jimdo's "most difficult moment".

In 2017, Jimdo launched its new artificially intelligent website builder, Jimdo Dolphin. The new AI-powered product enables users with basic computer skills to build their websites.

== Corporate affairs ==
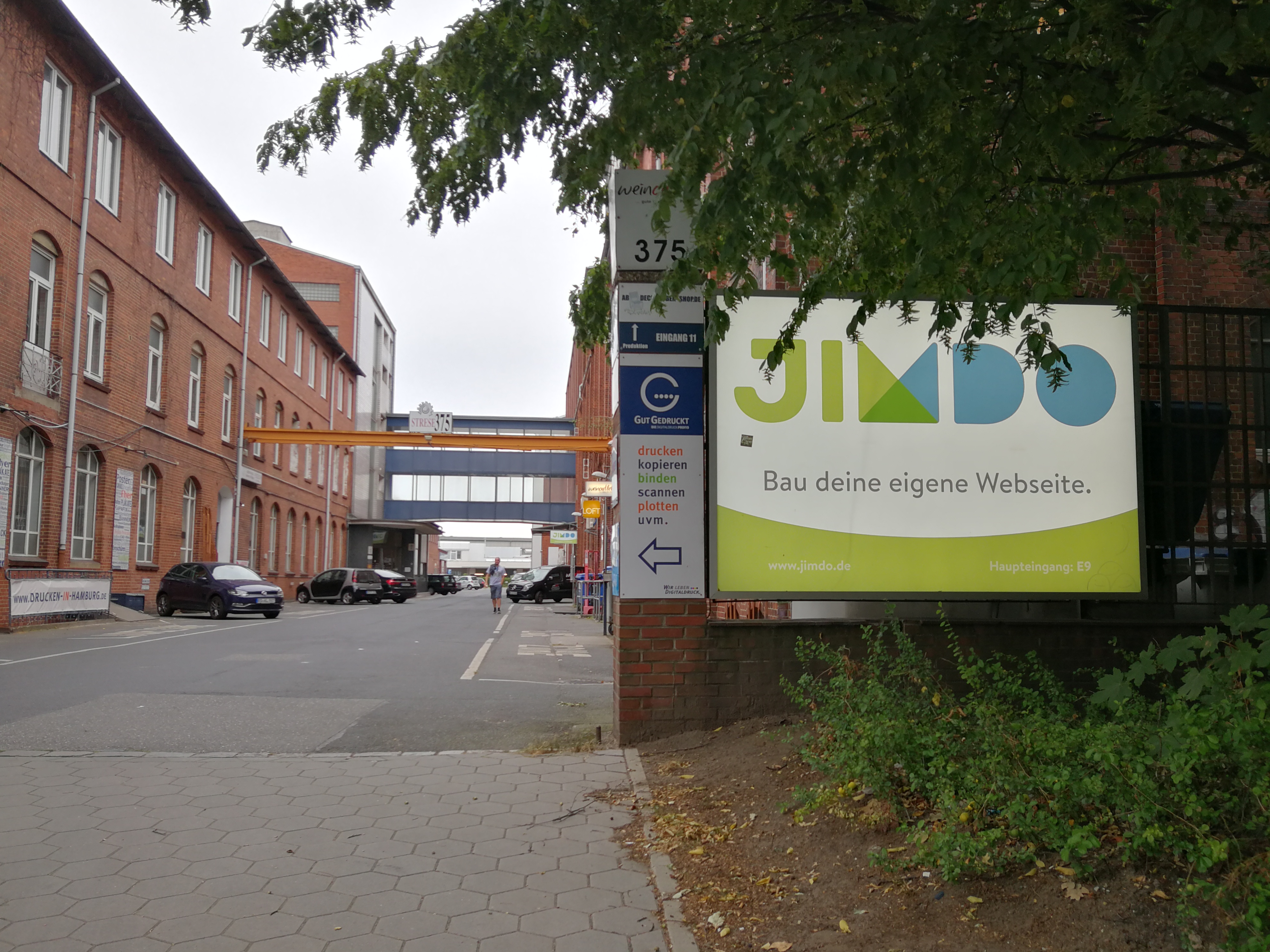
Entrance to the Hamburg office

The Jimdo head office is in Hamburg, Germany but Jimdo also has offices in Munich, Germany and Tokyo, Japan.

== Service ==
Jimdo offers two different services; Creator is the company's drag-and-drop website builder, and Dolphin is the company's new AI website builder. Both products offer free and premium subscription plans. As of 2019, there are seven languages available: English, German, French, Italian, Japanese, Dutch, and Spanish. The English-language service uses American English. To increase speed and performance for their worldwide user base.

== Reception ==
Two months after the service launch in 2007, Rafe Needleman of CNet gave a positive review to Jimdo. Needleman described Jimdo as a "good service for creating a quick site to document a trip or other event, or to prototype a simple personal or business site." He also said that Jimdo was not "mature enough yet" for use by a United States-based small business, "but it's worth keeping track of." In 2010, VentureBeat reported on the opening of the US office in San Francisco and the launch of an online store feature, concluding "US readers will probably hear more about the company in the coming months".

In 2012, David Pogue cited Jimdo in The New York Times, as a recommended replacement for the website building feature in Apple's MobileMe service, following Apple's decision to shut down the service on 30 June 2012. Reasoning that "Jimdo's design templates are better looking [than Weebly's], and the paid plan offers more advanced features. You can even sell stuff from your Jimdo site".

In 2013, USA Today commended Jimdo for "how easily it handles e-commerce" and its "ease of use", recommending it for small business owners who would be "unlikely to find a simpler solution".

In June 2018, following the release of Jimdo's new AI-driven website builder, Dolphin, Forbes writer Alison Coleman hailed the service as an alternative to "traditional website builders" that have "become extremely powerful and able to create extremely sophisticated results, but for most people, they still take too long and involve a steep learning curve". In contrast, Jimdo Dolphin "pulls everything together quickly, and their online content is ready and waiting. From there [Dolphin] provides further support, for example, handling some of the SEO tasks".

== See also ==
- Website builder
