= Wix.com =

Israeli software company

Wix.com Ltd.

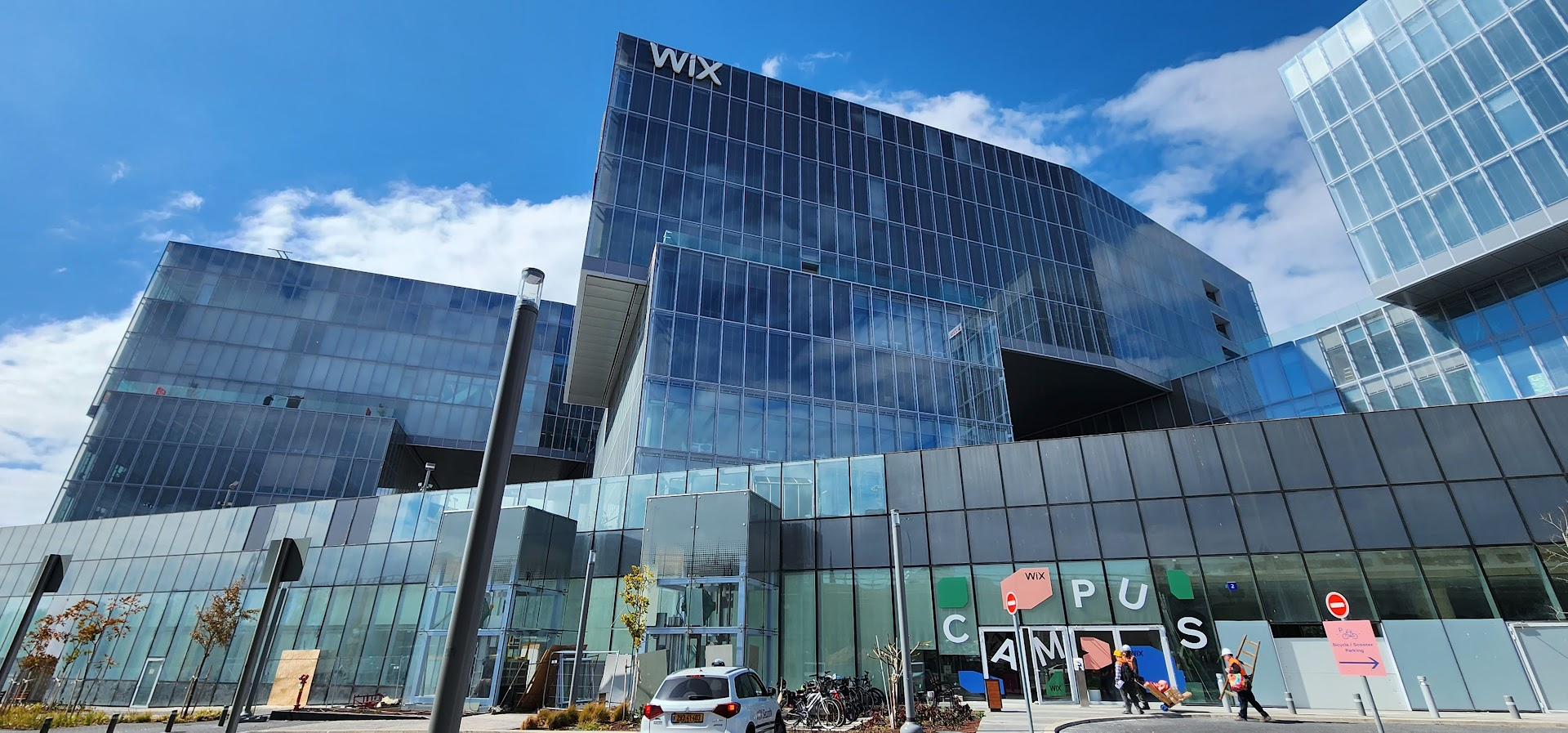
- WIX Campus in Tel Aviv, Israel
- Type: Public
- Traded as: Nasdaq: WIX
- ISIN: IL0011301780
- Industry: Internet
- Founded: 2006; 20 years ago
- Founders: Avishai Abrahami; Nadav Abrahami; Giora Kaplan
- Headquarters: Tel Aviv, Israel
- Number of locations: 22 (2022) List: New York City, New York US; Los Angeles, California, US; San Francisco, California, US; Denver, Colorado, US; Miami, Florida, US; Phoenix, Arizona, US; Cedar Rapids, Iowa, US; Austin, Texas, US; Beer Sheva, Israel; Haifa, Israel; Dnipro, Ukraine; Kyiv, Ukraine; Lviv, Ukraine; New Delhi, India; Tokyo, Japan; London, UK; Vilnius, Lithuania; Dublin, Ireland; Vancouver, Canada; Berlin, Germany; São Paulo, Brazil; Singapore
- Area served: Worldwide
- Key people: Mark Tluszcz (chairman); Avishai Abrahami (CEO); Nir Zohar (President)
- Products: Online services for stores, bookings, hotels, events, restaurants, fitness, video, music, shoutout, answers, logo maker
- Services: Website builder, business management, web hosting service
- Revenue: ▲US$1.76 billion (2024)
- Operating income: ▲US$100 million (2024)
- Net income: ▲US$138 million (2024)
- Total assets: ▲US$1.91 billion (2024)
- Total equity: ▼US$−79 million (2024)
- Owners: Baillie Gifford (14.2%); Starboard Value (9%)
- Number of employees: 5,283 (2024)
- Subsidiaries: DeviantArt; SpeedETab; Inkfrog; Rise.ai; Modalyst; Base44
- Website: wix.com

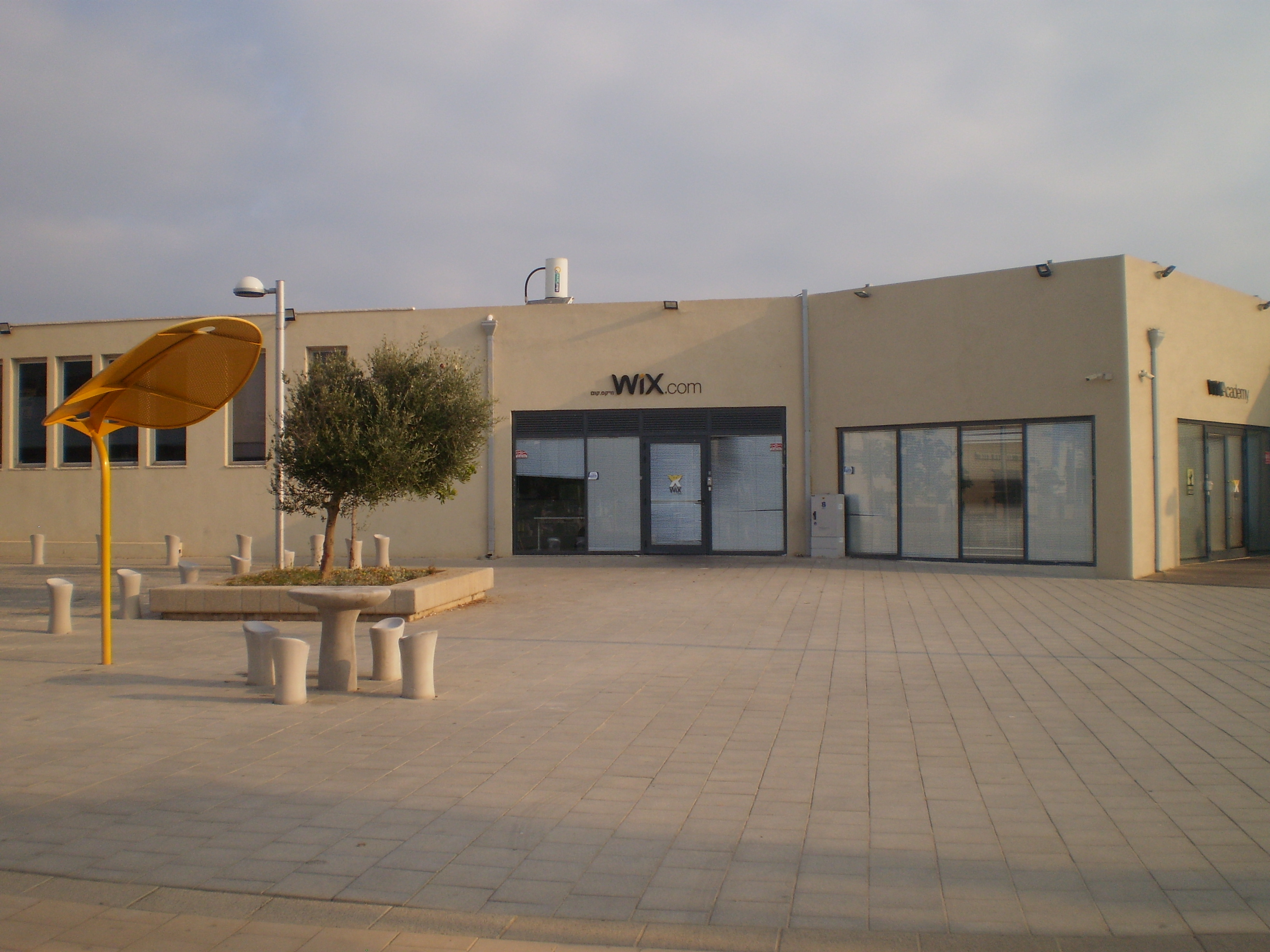
Wix's secondary headquarters, Tel Aviv, Israel

Wix.com Ltd. (Hebrew: ווִיקס.קוֹם, romanized: wix.com), or simply Wix, is an Israeli software company, publicly listed in the US, that provides cloud-based web development services. It offers tools for creating HTML5 websites for desktop and mobile platforms using online drag-and-drop editing. Along with its headquarters and other offices in Israel, Wix also has offices in Brazil, Canada, Germany, India, Ireland, Japan, Lithuania, Poland, the Netherlands, the United States, Ukraine, and Singapore.

Users can add applications for social media, e-commerce, online marketing, contact forms, email marketing, and community forums to their websites. The Wix website builder is built on a freemium business model, earning its revenues through premium upgrades. According to W3Techs, a technology survey website, Wix was used by 2.5% of websites as of September 2023; at the end of May 2025, it was 3.8%.

== History ==
=== Corporate affairs ===
Wix was founded in 2006 by Israeli developers Avishai Abrahami, Nadav Abrahami, and Giora Kaplan. With its main offices in Tel Aviv, Wix was backed by investors Insight Venture Partners, Mangrove Capital Partners, Bessemer Venture Partners, DAG Ventures, and Benchmark Capital.

By April 2010, Wix had 3.5 million users and raised US$10 million in Series C funding provided by Benchmark Capital and existing investors Bessemer Venture Partners and Mangrove Capital Partners. In March 2011, Wix had 8.5 million users and raised US$40 million in Series D funding, bringing its total funding to that date to US$61 million.

By August 2013, the Wix platform had more than 34 million registered users.

On 5 November 2013, Wix had an initial public offering on NASDAQ, raising about US$127 million for the company and some shareholders.

In 2016, Mark Tluszcz became the chair of the board of directors.

In 2020, Wix's revenue increased to $989 million, a 30% rise year-on-year, primarily due to the shift of businesses online during the coronavirus pandemic. The company added over 31 million new registered users in 2020, reaching a total of 196.7 million by year's end. Wix added approximately 1 million net new premium subscriptions in 2020, surpassing $1 billion in annual collections for the first time. By the end of the year, there were 5.5 million premium subscriptions, a 22% increase compared to the end of 2019.

As of its most recent reporting in June 2024, Wix has over 260 million users worldwide.

In May 2026, Wix announced layoffs affecting approximately 1,000 employees, or 20% of its workforce. CEO Avishai Abrahami cited two factors: the need to restructure around artificial intelligence and the appreciation of the Israeli shekel against the US dollar, which increased the cost of its Israel-based workforce relative to its dollar-denominated revenue.

=== Product development ===
==== 2000s ====
Wix entered an open beta phase in 2007 using a platform based on Adobe Flash.

==== 2010s ====
In June 2011, Wix launched the Facebook store module, making its first step into social commerce.

In March 2012, Wix launched a new HTML5 site builder, replacing the Adobe Flash technology.

In October 2012, Wix launched an app market for users to sell applications built with the company's automated web development technology.

In August 2014, Wix launched Wix Hotels, a booking system for hotels, bed and breakfasts, and vacation rentals that use Wix websites.

In June 2016, Wix introduced Wix ADI (Artificial Design Intelligence), a platform that uses artificial intelligence to design websites.

==== 2020s ====
In 2020, Wix launched an additional CMS, EditorX, which included additional CSS features to the original builder.

In July 2023, Wix announced that it would be building on its ADI technology to create an AI powered website generator

In October 2023, Wix launched the Wix Studio website builder. Co-founder and CEO, Avishai Abrahami described the platform as a “product for agencies”.

In March 2024, the AI web builder, which uses a chatbot to help users create content was launched to the public.

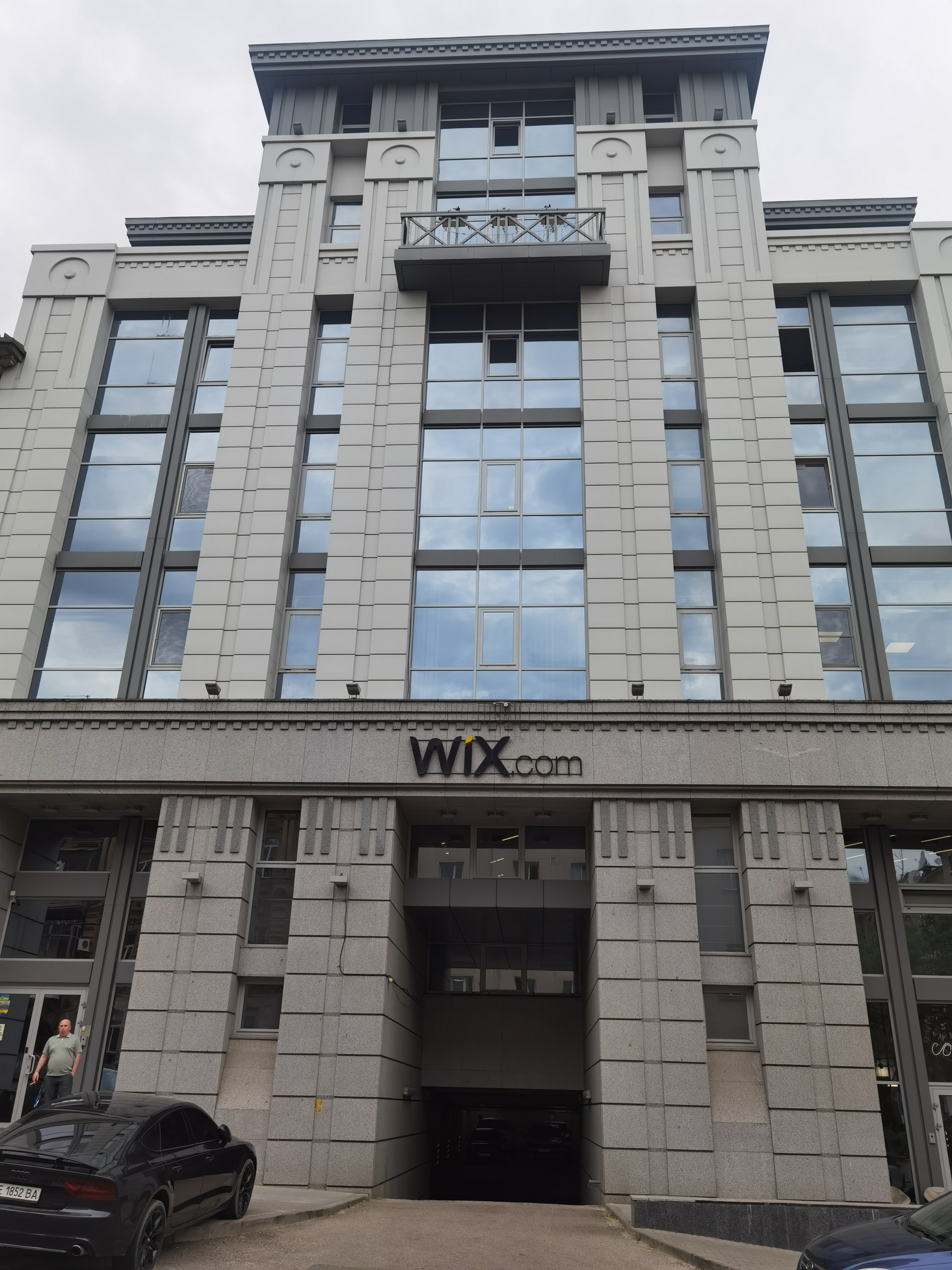
Wix.com in Dnipro, Ukraine

In March 2025, the digital publisher CNET has identified Wix as the "Best overall website builder overall."

In August 2025, Wix announced it would launch banking services—including checking accounts and loans for small businesses—via a partnership with Israeli fintech Unit Finance, as it sought to diversify amid what it described as threats to its core website-building business from artificial intelligence.

In January 2026, Wix launched Wix Harmony. Wix harmony is an AI website builder that uses agentic technology, generative design and vibe coding—with manual editing features for additional control.

=== Mergers and acquisitions ===
In April 2014, Wix announced the acquisition of Appixia, an Israeli startup for creating native mobile commerce (mCommerce) apps. In October 2014, Wix announced its acquisition of OpenRest, a developer of online ordering systems for restaurants.

In April 2015, Wix acquired Moment.me, a mobile website builder for events and marketing tools for social lead generation.

On 23 February 2017, Wix acquired the online art community DeviantArt for US$36 million.

In January 2017, the company acquired Flok, a provider of customer loyalty programs tools.

In February 2020, Wix acquired Inkfrog for eBay sellers, a web design company that provides customized business management software for eBay sellers.

On 2 March 2021, Wix acquired SpeedETab, a Miami-based restaurant online technology provider.

In May 2021, Wix acquired Rise.ai, a gift card and customer re-engagement package for online brands. A month later, Wix acquired Modalyst, a marketplace and drop-shipping platform.

In May 2025, Wix acquired Hour One, a startup specializing in AI-powered video creation tools, to enhance its generative AI capabilities.

In June 2025, the company acquired Base44, owned by independent entrepreneur Maor Shlomo, with the intention of integrating Base44's artificial intelligence capabilities and conversational interface into Wix's website and app building platform.

== Description ==
Wix uses a freemium business model. Users can create websites for free then must purchase premium packages to connect their sites to their own domains, remove Wix ads, access the form builder, add e-commerce capabilities, or buy extra data storage and bandwidth.

Wix provides customizable website templates and a drag-and-drop HTML5 website builder that includes apps, graphics, image galleries, fonts, vectors, animations, and other options. Users also may opt to create their web sites from scratch. In October 2013, Wix introduced a mobile editor for mobile viewing customization.

Wix App Market offers both free and subscription-based applications, with a revenue split of 80% for the developer and 20% for Wix. Customers can integrate third-party applications into their own web sites, such as photograph feeds, blogging, music playlists, online community, e-mail marketing, and file management.

Custom JavaScript code can be inserted into Wix webpages using the Velo API.

Since 2023, Wix has expanded its use of artificial intelligence from earlier standalone tools to AI-generated website creation, business management tools, and agents across the platform.

Wix's AI tools combine third-party LLM technology with Wix's own proprietary AI technology. In 2026, Wix released a dedicated proprietary model for Harmony, which the company said was intended to reduce inference and compute costs. Wix's subsidiary Base44 followed in the second quarter with its own model, Base1, for vibe coding. Base44's founder has said Base1 is a fine-tuned version of an existing open-source model rather than one trained from scratch.

Wix has also built integrations connecting its platform to third-party AI systems, including OpenAI's Codex, Microsoft 365 Copilot, and Google's Gemini.

== Products and services ==
=== Website builder ===
Wix's core product is a drag-and-drop website builder offering customizable templates for creating HTML5 websites. Operationally, Wix falls into the category of all-in-one hosted website-building platforms, which handle server security, backups, and software updates on the user's behalf.

In July 2023, Wix announced plans to evolve template-driven automation to a generative artificial intelligence website builder capable of constructing sites from natural-language prompts. The company officially launched the Wix AI Website Builder in March 2024, enabling users to generate customized site structures, themes, page layouts, and copy through a conversational interface.

In July 2024, Wix expanded the website builder's capabilities to automatically generate full-length blog posts, images, and search engine optimization (SEO) metadata. The platform completely superseded Wix's previous automated tool, Wix ADI (Artificial Design Intelligence)—which had operated on structured questionnaires since 2016—until ADI was officially retired in November 2024. In January 2026, Wix launched Wix Harmony, an AI website builder that adds an agentic interface for design changes alongside a visual editor.

=== Website builder for agencies ===
Wix Studio is a website-building platform for design agencies, freelancers, and other web professionals, offering advanced layout and collaboration tools for creating and managing websites for clients. It originated as Editor X, which Wix introduced in 2020 as a web design platform with advanced layout and responsive-design capabilities. Editor X was subsequently rebranded and relaunched as Wix Studio.

=== E-commerce website builder ===
Wix's e-commerce offering centers on Wix Stores, a tool integrated into the platform for managing products, inventory, checkout, and payments. As of August 2026, Wix Stores was the most-used e-commerce software among websites in the United Kingdom according to Statista. Wix has also expanded its e-commerce capabilities through acquisitions, including Modalyst, a dropshipping and supplier marketplace.

Wix has support for agentic commerce. Wix was a launch partner for PayPal's agentic commerce services, announced in October 2025, and participated in Stripe's Agentic Commerce Suite, announced in December 2025. As of mid-2026, Wix.com Ltd. is also the only website builder that is a corporate signatory to the Agentic Commerce Protocol's contributor license agreement.

=== Headless CMS ===
Wix Headless is a headless content management system launched in 2023 that decouples a website's frontend from Wix's backend. It allows developers to build frontends using frameworks such as React, Vue, or Svelte and deploy them on hosting platforms including Netlify, Vercel, or AWS. The platform is intended for developers who want to use Wix's backend services while building and hosting the frontend independently.

Wix Headless can be used with generative AI web development tools, including Anthropic's Claude Design, OpenAI's Codex, and Base44. Developers can use these tools to generate website frontends connected to Wix's backend services via natural-language prompts.

=== Domain registration ===
Wix obtained ICANN accreditation as a domain name registrar in 2018 (IANA ID 3817), having previously operated only as a reseller through a third-party registrar. Wix is directly accredited for .com and .net domains and acts as a reseller for other top-level domains. As of February 2026, Wix ranked 11th among .com registrars by volume, according to ICANN data.

=== AI agent platform ===
In August 2026, Symphony by Wix was launched as a standalone multi-agent platform designed to manage small and medium-sized business operations, including marketing, sales, scheduling, and customer support. The system is orchestrated by a central AI agent named Maestro, which coordinates domain-specific agents across background workflows. The platform operates as a standalone application that can integrate with existing Wix site data or external business software.

== Controversies ==
=== Use of WordPress code ===
In October 2016, there was a controversy over Wix's use of WordPress's GPL-licensed code. In response, Avishai Abrahami, Wix's CEO, published a response describing which open-source code was used and how Wix says it collaborates with the open-source community. However, it was subsequently noted that collaboration with the open-source community was not sufficient under the terms of the GPL license, which requires any code built on GPL-licensed code to be released under the same license.

=== Censorship ===
On 31 May 2021, the Wix-hosted website '2021 Hong Kong Charter', run by exiled Hong Kong activists, was shut down at the request of the Hong Kong Police. This was the first known case of Hong Kong's National Security Law being used to censor content on an overseas website. Wix later apologized for "mistakenly removing the website" and reinstated it after it had been down for four days.

In October 2023, Wix fired an employee in Dublin, Ireland, for having made social media posts critical of Israel. This incident led to criticism of Wix from members of the Oireachtas (the Irish parliament) and from the head of the Irish government, Taoiseach Leo Varadkar, who said it was "not okay to dismiss somebody because of their political views". Deputy head of government, Tánaiste Micheál Martin, also condemned their dismissal, stating "we tolerate debate with freedom of speech, freedom of opinion, and people have different opinions on these issues." The dismissed employee, Courtney Carey, successfully sued the company for unfair dismissal. Wix did not contest the charge, admitting liability.

=== Outreach abroad ===
In October 2023, The Irish Times reported that an Israeli advertising agency advised Wix staff how they can tailor posts for "outreach abroad". This included advice for Wix employees to “show Westernity” in social media posts supporting Israel, stating that “unlike the Gazans, we look and live like Europeans or Americans.”

== See also ==
- List of Israeli companies listed on the Nasdaq
- Website builder
- Domain Registrar
