= Website builder =

Tool for building websites

A website builder is a software application or online service that enables users to create and publish websites without manual code editing. Website builders typically provide visual editing tools, pre-designed templates, and integrated features for managing website content, layout, and functionality. They are intended to simplify website creation for individuals, businesses, and organizations with little or no web development experience. Some examples of website builders are Google Sites, Wix.com and other services.

== History ==
Website builders emerged alongside the growth of the World Wide Web in the early 1990s. The first website, manually written in HTML, was created on August 6, 1991. Early websites were created by manually writing HyperText Markup Language (HTML), requiring users to edit source code directly. As the number of websites increased, software was developed to simplify the design process by providing graphical interfaces for creating and editing web pages.

During the mid-1990s, desktop web authoring applications such as FrontPage and Macromedia Dreamweaver popularized what you see is what you get (WYSIWYG) editing, allowing users to design websites visually while automatically generating HTML. By 1998, Dreamweaver had been established as the industry leader; however, some have criticized the quality of the code produced by such software as being overblown and reliant on HTML tables. As the industry moved towards W3C standards, Dreamweaver and others were criticized for not being compliant. Compliance has improved over time, but many professionals still prefer to write optimized markup by hand.

The W3C started Amaya in 1996 to showcase Web technologies in a fully featured Web client. This was to provide a framework that integrated many W3C technologies in a single, consistent environment. Amaya started as an HTML and CSS editor and eventually supported XML, XHTML, MathML, and SVG.

GeoCities was one of the first more modern site builders that didn't require any technical skills. Five years after its launch in 1994 Yahoo! purchased it for $3.6 billion. After becoming obsolescent, it was shut down in April 2009.

In the late 1990s and early 2000s, website creation increasingly shifted toward online platforms that combined visual editing with web hosting. Services such as GeoCities enabled users with little or no programming experience to publish personal websites using browser-based tools and pre-designed templates. As broadband Internet access became more widespread, cloud-based website builders gradually replaced desktop authoring software for many users.

Website builders have increasingly evolved from standalone authoring applications into integrated website publishing platforms. In this model, website creation, content management, hosting, deployment, and ongoing maintenance are provided through a single service. Platforms such as WordPress.com follow this approach by allowing users to build websites in a web browser using the WordPress content management system while handling hosting, software updates, security, and other technical maintenance.

Since the early 2020s, website builders have increasingly incorporated artificial intelligence (AI) to automate aspects of website creation, including layout generation, text drafting, image creation, and design recommendations. These developments have formed part of the broader growth of no-code and low-code development platforms, which aim to reduce the need for manual programming while enabling users to build websites and other digital applications.

== Categories ==
They fall into two categories:

- Online proprietary tools provided by web hosting service companies. These are typically intended for service users to build their own website. Some services allow the site owner to use alternative tools (commercial or open-source) — the more complex of these may also be described as content management systems.
- Application software that runs on a personal computing device used to create and edit the pages of a web site and then publish these pages on any host. (These are often considered to be "website design software", rather than "website builders".)

== See also ==
- Comparison of HTML editors
- List of HTML editors
- Web design
- HTML editor
- Visual editor
