= Bing Webmaster Tools =

Tool to provide better indexing and search performance on Bing

Microsoft Bing Webmaster Tools
- Website type: Webmaster portal
- Owner: Microsoft
- Website: www.bing.com/webmasters
- Launched: June 3, 2009; 17 years ago

Bing Webmaster Tools (previously the Bing Webmaster Center) is a free service as part of Microsoft's Bing search engine which allows webmasters to add their websites to the Bing index crawler, see their site's performance in Bing (clicks, impressions) and a lot more. The service also offers tools for webmasters to troubleshoot the crawling and indexing of their website, submission of new URLs, Sitemap creation, submission and ping tools, website statistics, consolidation of content submission, and new content and community resources.

== Features ==
Bing Webmaster Tools provides many features that can be accessed by webmasters after they verify the ownership of their websites using methods such as MetaTag verification, adding CNAME record to DNS entry, XML verification and Domain Connect.

It contains the following tools and features to support webmasters to access data and manage their websites on Bing:

- Submit Urls allows webmasters to submit thousands of URLs present in their website for faster indexing. The number of URLs they can submit can be as much as 10,000 URLs per day.
- Crawl issues allows webmasters to discover potential issues with their websites such as File Not Found (404) errors, blocked by REP, long dynamic URLs, and unsupported content-types.
- Backlink data allows webmasters to access data about their referring links. Part of this feature was acquired from Yahoo! Site Explorer.
- Advanced filtering allows webmasters to quickly scope the results in their website reports to zoom into the data they need.
- Data download allows webmasters to access the first 1000 results in a CSV file to analyze the results.
- Keyword search tool allows webmasters to explore new keywords.
- Robots.txt validator allows webmasters to check if their robots.txt file meets the standard.
- Sitemaps allows webmasters to check if Bing is viewing their XML sitemap, RSS, Atom or other sitemap formats correctly.

In October 2020, Bing Webmaster Tools integrated Microsoft Clarity, a behavioral analytics platform developed by Microsoft. This integration enabled site owners to view user engagement metrics such as heatmaps and session recordings directly within Bing Webmaster Tools.

In March 2024, Bing Webmaster Tools launched a new IndexNow Insights report. The report provides data on which URLs have been submitted using the IndexNow protocol, whether those URLs were successfully indexed, and how quickly search engines respond to those submissions.

== AI Performance report ==
In 2026, Bing announced a beta of an AI Performance report in Bing Webmaster Tools, describing it as "an early step toward Generative Engine Optimization (GEO) tooling in Bing Webmaster Tools, helping publishers understand how their content participates in AI-driven experiences." The report is focused on citation frequency.

According to Microsoft, the dashboard provides a consolidated view of how often a site's content is cited across Microsoft Copilot, AI-generated summaries in Bing, and selected partner integrations. The report includes metrics for total citations and average cited pages, a timeline showing changes in citation activity over time, grounding queries that indicate the phrases used to retrieve cited content, and page-level citation activity for individual URLs. Microsoft also said that some of the query data represents a sample of overall citation activity and may be refined as additional data is processed.

== See also ==
- Windows Live
- Microsoft Bing
- Google Search Console
