= Link page =

Web page offering links to other notable pages

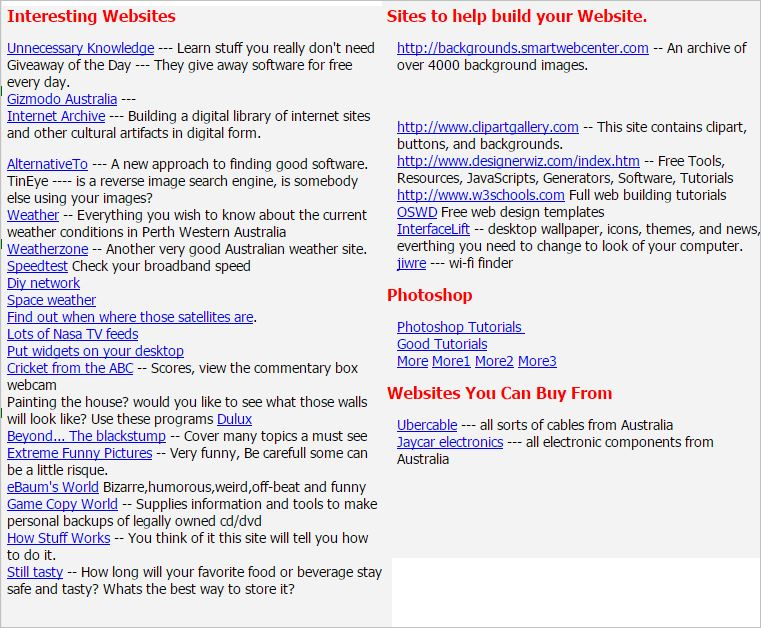
A website with lots of links

A link page is a type of web page that contains a list of links the website owner finds notable to mention, such as partner organizations, clients, friends, hobbies, or related projects.

Links pages were popular on personal websites during the Web 1.0 era, functioning similarly to webrings as a navigation device.

== See also ==
- Contact page
- Home page
- Site map
- Smart links
