= PowerMapper =

Web crawler software

- Developer(s): Electrum
- Stable release: 5.6 / Nov 18, 2011
- Operating system: Microsoft Windows
- Type: Web crawler
- License: EULA
- Website: http://www.powermapper.com/

PowerMapper is a web crawler that automatically creates a site map of a website using thumbnails from each web page.

== Map styles ==
A site map is a comprehensive list of pages within a website's domain. It can serve three primary purposes: offering structured listings specifically designed for web crawlers such as search engines, aiding designers during the website planning phase, and providing human-visible, typically hierarchical listings of site pages.

Site maps can be displayed in a number of different map styles. Some styles display thumbnails for each page, others use text-only presentation.

Map styles include:

- Electrum – a simple thumbnail map style
- Electrum 2.0 – a variation of the Electrum style that works better on larger sites
- Isometric – a thumbnail map style using a pseudo-3D isometric projection
- Page Cloud – a thumbnail map style with pages clustered into 3D clouds
- Skyscrapers – an abstract representation of pages that looks like city blocks
- Thumb Tree – a hierarchical thumbnail map style
- Table Map – a plain text list of pages in a table
- Table of Contents – a plain text list of pages
- Tree View – an expanding table of contents

Site maps can also be exported in XML site maps format for use by the Google, Yahoo and MSN search engines.

== See also ==
- Site map, a graphical representation of the architecture of a web site
- Sitemaps, a standard for URL inclusion in search engines
