= IndexNow =

Protocol for reporting website updates

- Year started: October 18, 2021; 5 years ago
- First published: October 18, 2021; 5 years ago
- Organization: Microsoft, Yandex, Naver, Seznam.cz
- Authors: Sawood Alam, Internet Archive; Martin Fiala, Seznam; Vishnevsky Gleb Yandex; Fabrice Canel Microsoft
- Base standards: HTTP, JSON, URL, UTF-8
- Related standards: RSS, robots.txt, Sitemaps
- Domain: Web indexing, Search engine optimization
- License: CC-BY-SA 4.0
- Website: www.indexnow.org

IndexNow is an open protocol that allows website owners to inform participating search engines directly whenever website content is ready for indexing. The system was introduced by Microsoft Bing and Yandex.

== History ==
IndexNow was launched in October 2021 as a collaboration between Microsoft Bing and Yandex. The protocol was developed with the intention to make the web more efficient by enabling faster content discovery and minimizing server load caused by repeated web crawling.

In January 2022, the Bing Webmaster team created a plugin for Wordpress.

In July 2023, Naver, a prominent South Korean search engine, announced its support for the IndexNow protocol.

In September 2023, Wix.com, a website builder, announced a native integration that automatically submit URL updates to IndexNow by default, as content is published on each site.

Bing Webmaster Tools added dedicated "IndexNow Insights Report" to their toolset in March 2024.

In May 2025, native integrations with Shopify and Amazon (company) were announced as a means to manage shopping content by including Schema.org mark up in the IndexNow feed.

== How it works ==
IndexNow is an open protocol. It operates at the application layer of the OSI model, as it enables communication between web servers (or content management systems) and search engines using HTTP requests to notify about content changes.

Traditionally, search engines rely on web crawlers to discover new URLs before indexing the webpages. Crawling is not automatic and in the case of Google, it can take a few days or event a few weeks for new content to be crawled. By contrast, IndexNow uses an API to notify search engines about content changes to content in order to trigger a recrawl.

To implement IndexNow, a website owner must generate an API key and host it in a text file at the site's root. When content changes, the website sends a simple HTTP request to a search engine endpoint, including the URL and the API key.

For example:

https://www.bing.com/indexnow?url=https://www.example.com/page.html&key=your-api-key

When a search engine receives an IndexNow notification, it automatically shares that information with all other search engines that support the protocol.

Websites can send notifications for individual pages or submit lists of up to 10,000 URLs at once.

== Adoption and tools ==
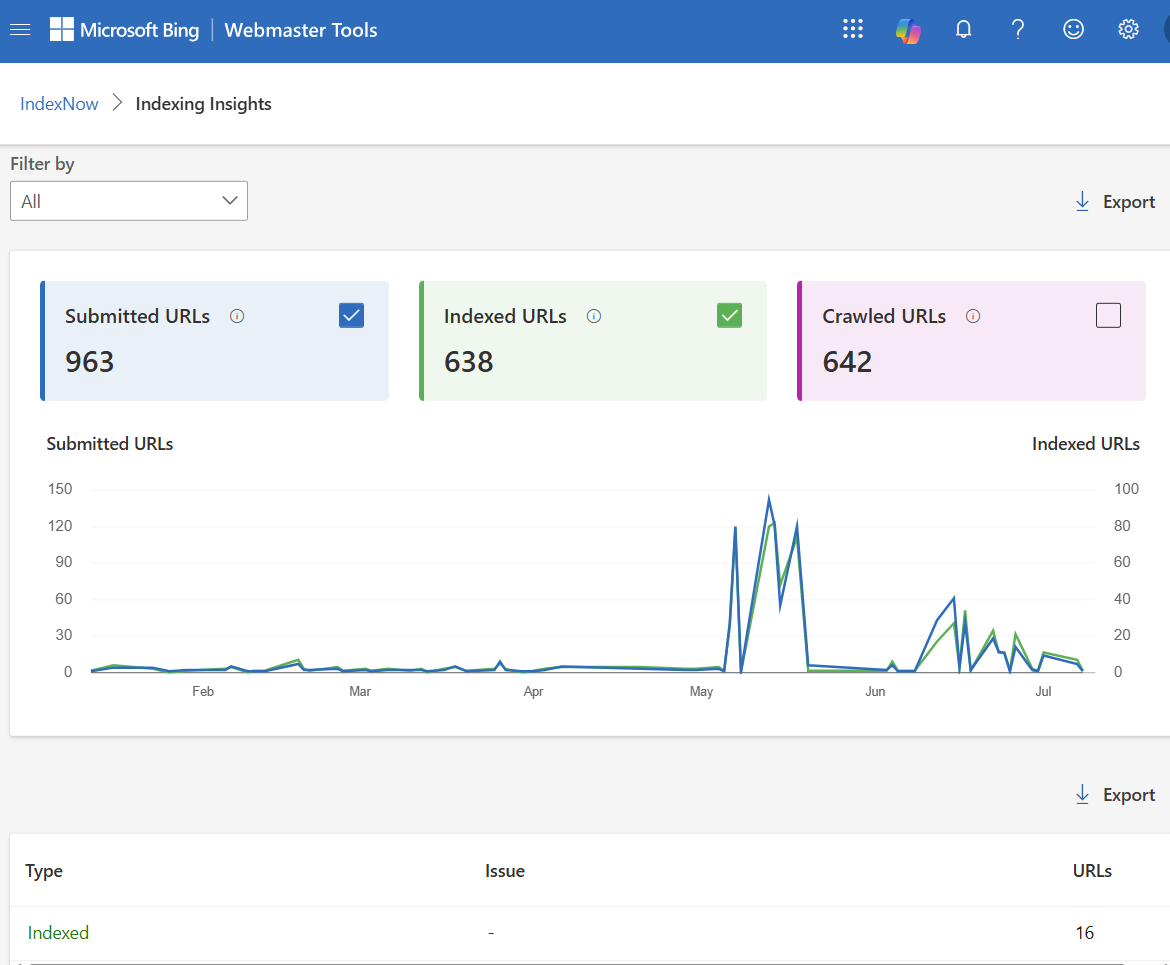
IndexNow Insights Report in Bing Webmaster Tools

In July 2022, reportedly 7% of new URLs clicked on Bing Search were sourced from the IndexNow protocol. As of September 2023, IndexNow was used by over 60 million websites, publishing over 1.4 billion URLs daily. As of 2024, IndexNow has grown to 2.5billion submitted URLs with 17% of all clicked URLs on Bing coming from IndexNow.

=== Search engines ===
As of 2025, several search engines support IndexNow, including:

- Microsoft Bing
- Yandex
- Naver
- Seznam.cz

=== Platforms and integrations ===
Since its release, IndexNow has been integrated into various platforms and services:

- Content management systems: Microsoft created a WordPress plugin to enable IndexNow. Wix.com and Shopify each feature native integrations.
- Hosting services: Cloudflare supports IndexNow via Crawler Hints
- Major websites: eBay, LinkedIn, MSN, GitHub, and Amazon use IndexNow.
- Third-party applications: Majinsoft developed IndexNow Sync, a mobile and desktop application.
- Webmaster Portal: Bing Webmaster Tools has an IndexNow dashboard report.

=== Google's adoption ===
In 2021, a spokesperson From Google confirmed they were "testing the potential benefits of the protocol" with regards to making "web crawling more efficient". As of 2022, Google had not officially adopted the IndexNow protocol. Google instead relies on an Indexing API for content like job postings.

== See also ==
- robots.txt
- Search engine optimization
- Sitemaps
- Web crawler
- Web indexing
