= EZGenerator =

Template-based web editing software

- Screenshot of EZGenerator v.4
- Developer(s): Image-Line
- Stable release: 4.4.0.3 / 6 July 2017
- Operating system: Windows NT / 98 / 2000 / Me / XP / Win2K3 / Vista / 7 / 8 / 8.1
- Type: Web Design Program
- License: Proprietary
- Website: www.EZGenerator.com

EZGenerator is a web design program created by Image-Line. The program is intended to be accessible to users with no experience in code such as HTML or CSS, and displays results in a WYSIWYG manner. EZGenerator is available for Windows operating systems. As of February 21, 2017, EZGenerator is no longer being developed, nor is it available to download unless done by an existing customer through their personal licenses page.

== History ==
EZGenerator was initially developed for Image-Line software in order for the company to maintain and set-up their own websites, such as the website for FL Studio and SampleFusion.com. The company eventually commercialized the program. Upon its release, EZGenerator was awarded 5/5 stars at Tucows As of June 2011, it was ranked #12 for web site tool downloads on CNET.

There have been four major version updates as of 2017. There was a one-time purchase to use the program, with no monthly fees. There was a yearly maintenance fee in order to continue downloading templates, etc. The free trial version contained an extra footer and a watermark on output.

Development was officially cancelled on February 21, 2017.

== System requirements ==
EZGenerator works on Windows NT / 98 / 2000 / Me / XP / Win2K3 / Vista / 7 / 8 / 8.1. As of January 2011, it requires Pentium II or higher, and Internet Explorer v5.0 or higher. It also requires a screen resolution of 1024x768 pixels or higher, and a screen color mode of 16 bit (65536 colors) or higher.

== Product overview ==
The program operates on the principle of WYSIWYG, (What You See Is What You Get), and allows for the creation of multiple websites by users with no technical skills or knowledge of HTML.

=== Publishing ===
EZGenerator uses FTP settings for publishing to the internet and uploading changes, meaning the websites can be hosted on any server or hosting company. There is a login feature that allows users to edit web-editable pages created from the program from any PC. Using FTP, the program also determines which files need to be uploaded for an update. The program has a test server so websites can be viewed before they are launched on their actual hosting accounts. EZGenerator is built in with tools to make it search engine friendly, with automatic meta descriptions, <h1> tags, and alt image tags, and file names for SEO.

=== Creation ===
The program includes a Wizard that allows users to pick a project type and complete a working website in 15 minutes or less. EZGenerator includes over 3,000 free web templates, and each one is customizable. Pages can also be built from scratch.

EZGenerator works with Google features such as Adwords, Google Checkout, Google Analytics, and Google Maps. It has an e-commerce model that allows for products and services to be listed in a catalog, and allows for accepting credit cards and PayPal payments via the site. Other features include a built in search function and hit counter, PHP contact pages with captchas, and RSS publisher, a calendar, and a guestbook, newsletter management, and interactive Flash polls for surveys. The websites can also be made into blogs and photo-blogs. The program generates its own XML sitemap for the websites.

Media

Images are automatically scaled to be a web suitable format, and the program as built-in image editors to allow for cropping, text additions, manipulation of image properties, and effects. Images can be displayed in slideshows, image pop-ups, or thumbnail modes.

The program has a built-in podcasting and video-casting module. Flash media-players can display mp3s and video, and stream them directly from YouTube or Google Video.

== Support ==
Image-line has an online support forum where employees post answers to questions within 24 hours.
