= Deckadance =

DJ software

- Deckadance 1.90.0 running on Windows
- Developer: Stanton Magnetics
- Release: October 1, 2007
- Stable release: 2.72 / January 28, 2017
- Operating system: Windows, OS X
- Available in: English
- Type: DJ console and mixing
- License: Crippleware
- Website: www.stantondj.com/deckadance-2.html

Deckadance (often referred to as DD) is a DJ console and mixing tool developed by Image-Line software and acquired in 2015 by Gibson. Initially released in May 2007, it operates on Windows and Mac OS X, and comes in a House Edition and Club Edition. The latter has support for timecoded vinyl.

Deckadance can be used as a standalone application or as a VST plugin inside VST-supporting software hosts like Ableton Live. It can host any VST-compliant effect or software synthesizer, and can be controlled by most MIDI controllers.

== History ==
Deckadance was created by Image-Line as a mixing application for DJs. Image-Line worked closely with DJ and programmer Arguru to develop the first version, which was released for Windows in May 2007. After Arguru died in a car accident in June 2007, future versions were worked on by the Image-Line developers Arguru had been cooperating with, many of whom are also DJs. Deckadance was made compatible with Mac OS X after the release of version 1.20.0 in January 2008. The most recent release is version 2.43 from April 28, 2015.

== Software overview ==
Version 1.2 on OS X, first for Macs

System requirements

As of version 1.9, the minimum system requirements for Deckadance on a PC are Windows 7, Vista, or XP (SP2). Hardware requirements consist of 512 MB RAM, 200 MB free hard drive space, and a DirectSound or ASIO compatible soundcard. Also required is either an Intel Pentium III 1 GHz or AMD Athlon XP 1.4 GHz processor. A Mac requires Mac OS X v10.4 (Universal binary), 512 Mb RAM, 200 Mb free hard drive space, and a sound card with CoreAudio drivers. Processor must be either G4 1.5 GHz or Intel Core Duo family.

Versions

Deckadance is available in two different editions. The House Edition can host VST compliant effects and can be controlled via a MIDI controller. The Club Edition contains all of the features of the House Edition, in addition to support for timecoded vinyls.

== Features ==
Among Deckadance features are iTunes integration, an audio synchronization engine that can work in tandem with other VST hosts such as Ableton Live, a detachable Song Manager (SM) that can integrate with iTunes, zPlane Elastique technology, a colored waveform with red to distinguish bass, the ability to time-code one's own CD (Club Edition), beat detection, a two-channel mixer with three-band EQ, and headphone cueing. As of version 1.9, Deckadance has seven internal performance effects, including LP, HP, BP, Notch, Phaser, Echo, and Low fidelity.

- User interface - Deckadance uses a GUI that slightly resembles that of Image-Line's digital audio workstation FL Studio, which consists of one main window that can expand to fill the entire screen. As of 1.3x there are 6 changeable user skins. As of version 1.9, the program no longer covers the start bar and the icons resemble those of Apple's Aqua graphics.
- VST options - Deckadance is designed to work either as a standalone program or as a VSTi 2.4 plugin inside VST-supporting software hosts. For example, Deckadance can be used as a plugin in digital audio workstations such as FL Studio, Ableton Live, Cakewalk Sonar, and Cubase. Deckadance can host VST-compliant effects or software synthesizers, and the VSTs can be controlled with MIDI files, making Deckadance into an 8 track music sequencer.
- Samplers - Deckadance has eight integrated sampler banks that can save 1, 2, 4, or 8 beat pattern loops from the decks. The sampling process works in conjunction with a beat detection feature, meaning the samples can be automatically synced to tempo. There is a volume control for sampler slot output, and effects can be layered onto the sample banks. It also allows for the recording and looping of live audio.
- ReLooper - The ReLooper slices and re-arranges samples in the playback buffer for either Deck A or Deck B, with the looped region defined by beat markers. Master ReLooper effects include a wha-wha filter, panoramic LFO, ring-modulator, and track-coder that combines a vocoder and low-fi distortion effect.

== Controllers ==
Deckadance can be controlled using a mouse, keyboard, CD system, MIDI controller, or in the case of the Club Edition, timecoded vinyl. The program uses a MIDI auto detection system. Deckadance works with several timecoded vinyl and CDs. Through an "autolearning system," Image-Line claims the program can use essentially all CD and vinyl controllers on the market. When using vinyl, the program distinguishes between "absolute mode", which allows for needle dropping and jump track position from the vinyl, and "relative mode", which doesn't. Both modes allow for scratching and the manual control of playback speed and direction.

Supported midi controllers

Brand	Model(s) and first supporting DD version
Allen & Heath	Xone:3D (0.99)
American Audio	Digital Producer 2/DP2 (1.7), VMS4 (1.8)
Behringer	BCD2000 (0.96), BCD3000 (1.13)
DJ-Tech	i-Mix / i-Mix Reload (1.3), Kontrol One K1 + M1 (1.5), DJ Mouse (1.5), i-Mix MKII (1.6), 101 Series (1.7), DJ For All (1.7), uSolo FX (1.72), Pocket DJ (1.72), Mix Free
EKS	XP-5 (1.30), XP-10 (0.85), Otus (1.40.3)
Hercules	Console MK2, MK4, and Steel (1.0), RMX (1.3), Control MP3 and MP3 E2 (1.3)
Kontrol Dj	KDJ500 (1.08)
M-Audio	X-Session Pro (1.0), Xponent (1.3)
Numark	Total Control (1.2), Omni Control (1.6)
Omnitronic	MMC-1 (1.31.2)
OpenLabs	DBeat
Percussa	Audiocubes (1.4)
Reloop	Digital Jockey
Stanton	SCS-1D (1.3), SCS-3D/DaScratch (1.40.4)
SYNQ	PCM-1 (1.3), DMC-1000 (1.71), DMC-2000 (1.9)
Vestax	VCI-100 (1.3), VCI-300 (1.5), VCM-100 (1.3), Typhoon (1.8)

== Version history ==
Version	Release	Notes
1.00.0	May 3, 2007	The initial "final release."
1.08.0	May 14, 2007	Timecode tracking latency minimized.
1.10.0	May 24, 2007	New playlist system and GUI interface, new keyboard shortcuts, Nintendo Wii Remote native controller support. Last version worked on by Arguru.
1.14.0	October 1, 2007	Introduction of the House Edition, which doesn't include vinyl tracking system. New "Hitech" skin. Equalization processing to input lines.
1.20.x	January 15, 2008	Mac OS X release, new Deckadance LE Edition available to hardware manufacturers. Master level volume to the new minihost, vinyl timcode control of decks inside Live and Live LE.
1.30.0	February 22, 2008	Implementation of OpenGL to increase speed and also use around 30% of the CPU (rather than reports of the CPU getting up to 100% on the Mac). Automatic storing of cue points.
1.30.6/7		Added jog control to the EXT CTRL panel for House and LE editions, and improved scratch behavior for the Kontrol Dj KDJ500 controller. Added new skins: Blue, New White, Synq, Vestax and Dj-Tech, and removed the old black, white and vestax skins.
1.30.9	9/2008	New render engine, automatic storing of cue points, new Midi function list, support for 14 bit Midi pitch messages, deck load locked features, new loop move feature.
1.31.0	April 9, 2008	Neon skin added, waveform color support via skin.
1.40.x	December 28, 2008	New in-built support for midi streaming, new sound engine, new BPM setup panel/beatgrid system.
1.45.0	May 7, 2009	Support to load/import iTunes playlists, new OpenGL render engine for Windows, support and BPM reading for ID3V1/2 tags.
1.50.3	May 24, 2009	Batch analysis of songs added, new beatgrid move via mouse over waveform.
1.60.x	October 29, 2009	New Control CD Creator to create accurate timecode file for CD players, new audio setup panel, iTunes integration panel, support added for Japanese glyphs. 1.60.1 introduced new BPM detector engine, new search function for playlist and iTunes panel, and new playlist archive history. Version 1.60.3 (February 12, 2010) consisted of problem fixes.
1.7x.x	July 27, 2010	Support added for mp3, flac, m4a, wma, wav, aiff, and ogg, multi-language support for help system, Image-Line GrossBeat support. Added tag reading for FLAC, m4a, wma, and ogg, added auto-detection of Midi controllers.
1.80.0	November 21, 2010	Added SNAP feature to closest beat in waveform, DVS runout/protection and Lead In function, added downbeat and start position keyboard shortcuts. Song manager added.
1.92.0	February 2, 2011	New synchronization engine. Support for sync inside other vst hosts [DD-270]; Added SNAP and QUANTIZE functions [DD-271]; Song Manager fully integrated into DD [DD-272]; New File Tree browser [DD-273]; New Options & Setup organized into a unified tabbed system [DD-274]; Added support for Synq DMC-2000 [DD-275]; Changed keyboard shortcuts [DD-276]: DECK A->Downbeat: "ctrl+u", DECK B->Downbeat: "ctrl+j", PREVIEW: "ctrl+p".
1.93.0	September 14, 2011	Added font size option in setup window [DD-277]; Added song manager resizer buttons [DD-278]; Added rating read from ID3V2 tags at song import [DD-279]; Change low equalizer band design and behavior of kill buttons [DD-280]; Changed behavior of sync button (momentary/lock) [DD-281]; Fixed sample recorder & save function [DD-282]; Fixed re-analysis process and results update [DD-283]; Fixed key change interference with beat align [DD-284]; Fixed reload of tags in the song manager [DD-285]; Fixed master bpm editing in minihost for OSX [DD-286]; Fixed mouse down events for some problematic hosts in OSX [DD-287]; Improved midi mapping for Synq DMC2000 mixer section [DD-288]; Added integration of recommendation system to DigitalDj edition [DD-289].
1.94.0	March 2, 2012	Added native support for Vestax VCI-400 [DD-290]; Added native support for Vestax VCI-100 mkII [DD-291]; Added utilities popup menu for iTunes items (load to A, load to B and preview) [DD-292]; Added utilities popup menu for filebrowser items (load to A, load to B and preview) [DD-293]; Fixed problem of skipping beats when loop out is executed [DD-294]; Fixed problem with leap function not working correctly in version 1.93 [DD-295]; Fixed problem with relooper triggering inside loops [DD-296]; Fixed problem with minihost when the program is closed and no soundcard is selected [DD-297]; Fixed problem with auto detection of Synq DMC2000 [DD-298]; Changed default music path to user's music folder [DD-299].
2.00	April 16, 2013	Decks, 2 or 4 deck mixing [DD-302]; Smartknobs - Link a single knob to any number of FX & Mixer interface targets under user programmable envelope control [DD-303]; GrossBeat - 8 user defined FX per deck with integrated editor [DD-304]; Frequency isolated effects - Up to 3 chained insert effects per track [DD-305]; Sampler – 1/32 to 16 step beat-matched easy sampling. One shot, trigger, retrigger and loop modes [DD-306]; Smart Panels. User configurable Loop, Cue, Grid, DVS, Key, Smart Knob and Tempo panels. From 2 to 8 per deck [DD-307]; Customizable interface. Configure decks, smart panels and Function panels [DD-308].
2.10.0	May 4, 2013	Added native support for Behringer CMD 4A, MM-1, PL-1, DV-1, MICRO, DC-1, LC-1 controllers [DD-309].
2.24.0	August 14, 2013	Added midi scripting [DD-310]; Fixed program hang when loading one song in a deck while it's currently loading another one [DD-311]; Fixed jog touch sensor detection while backspin [DD-312]; Fixed problem with auto detection of Behringer CMD controllers [DD-313]; Fixed problem when using various identical controllers at the same time [DD-314].
2.25.0	October 30, 2013	Added VST parameters visibility for the plugin version [DD-315]; Added native support for Casio XW-J1 [DD-316].
2.30.0	September 15, 2014	New IL Remote app support [DD-317]; New utility panels: EQ, Gain & Filter, Volume, Mix & Isolator, FX and Grossbeat [DD-318]; Added splash screen for standalone version [DD-319]; Added new MIDI script commands PLAY_X, PHASE_SYNC_X, BEAT_ID_X, STANDALONE and TRACK_POSITION_X [DD-320]; Added support for ESI soundcards [DD-321]; Fixed keyboard shortcuts support [DD-322]; Fixed problem with soundcard samplerates >= 99600 kHz [DD-323]; Fixed synchronization problem with the leap out function in snap mode [DD-324]; Added switching of midi ports between standard midi page and script one [DD-325]; Changed MIDI preferences dialog design plus internal changes to the midi engine [DD-326].
2.42.0	January 13, 2015	Additions: New Elastique v3 engine with improved transient processing.; New multi controller support (via scripting).; Added native support for Behringer CMD 2A.; Added native support for Casio XW-DJ1. Bugfixes: Fix iTunes library importing problem for OSX (Yosemite update).; Fixed crashes at song loading.; Fixed leap function.; Fixed warning messages drawing.; Fixed manual editing of filepaths in the song manager. Changes: Changed preferences dialog window for MIDI scripting and ILRemote areas.; Changed some midi scripting commands from toggle to momentary ones: SYNC_LOCK, SNAP, LOOP, LEAP, KEY_LOCK, FX_(HIGH/MID/LOW)_BAND_GROUP and EFFECT_ON.
2.48.0	April 28, 2015	Additions: Added MIDI scripts for Hercules controllers: UniversalDJ, DJC Wave, DJC Rmx2, DJC Air, DJC Air Plus, DJC Instinct, DJC 4M, DJC MP3 E2, DJC 4 Set (Special thanks to DJ Phatso, Hercules technical support) [DD-340]. Bugfixes: Fixed sendSysExMessage command in MIDI scripting engine [DD-341].; Fixed various problems in the MIDI scripts provided in v2.42 [DD-342]. Image-Line, "Deckadance History", retrieved July 17, 2015

== See also ==
- FL Studio
- Image-Line software
- Arguru
- VST plug-in
