= Yahoo Site Explorer =

Yahoo! Site Explorer (YSE) was a Yahoo! service which allowed users to view information on websites in Yahoo!'s search index. The service was closed on November 21, 2011, and merged with Bing Webmaster Tools, a tool similar to Google Search Console (previously Google Webmaster Tools). In particular, it was useful for finding information on backlinks pointing to a given webpage or domain because YSE offered full, timely backlink reports for any site. After merging with Bing Webmaster Tools, the service only offers full backlink reports to sites owned by the webmaster. Reports for sites not owned by the webmaster are limited to 1,000 links.

Webmasters who added a special authentication code to their websites were also allowed to:

- See extra information on their sites
- Submit Sitemaps
- Submit up to 20 URL removal requests for their domains to Yahoo!.
- Rewrite dynamic URLs from their site by either removing a dynamic parameter or by using a default value for a parameter.
- Submit feeds for Yahoo Search Monkey
- View Errors Yahoo encountered while crawling their web site
