= ITools =

iTools or ITools may refer to:

- iTools, an online service from Apple (later known as .Mac then MobileMe, before evolving into the current iCloud service)
- ITools Resourceome, a computer image tool for displaying complex data maps
