= Resources of a Resource =

XML format for describing common website objects to search engines

Resources of a Resource (ROR) is an XML format for describing the content of an internet resource or website in a generic fashion so this content can be better understood by search engines, spiders, web applications, etc. The ROR format provides several pre-defined terms for describing objects like sitemaps, products, events, reviews, jobs, classifieds, etc. The format can be extended with custom terms.

RORweb.com is the official website of ROR; the ROR format was created by AddMe.com as a way to help search engines better understand content and meaning. Similar concepts, like Google Sitemaps and Google Base, have also been developed since the introduction of the ROR format.

ROR objects are placed in an ROR feed called ror.xml. This file is typically located in the root directory of the resource or website it describes. When a search engine like Google or Yahoo searches the web to determine how to categorize content, the ROR feed allows the search engines "spider" to quickly identify all the content and attributes of the website.

This has three main benefits:

1. It allows the spider to correctly categorize the content of the website into its engine.
2. It allows the spider to extract very detailed information about the objects on a website (sitemaps, products, events, reviews, jobs, classifieds, etc.)
3. It allows the website owner to optimize his site for inclusion of its content into the search engines.
