= Juan Antonio Arguelles Rius =

Arguru

Background information
- Also known as: Arguru
- Born: Juan Antonio Arguelles Rius; November 2, 1978; Málaga, Spain
- Died: June 3, 2007 (aged 28) Benalmádena, Spain
- Genres: Psychedelic trance, pop, techno, dance
- Occupations: music producer, songwriter, and programmer
- Instrument: FL Studio
- Years active: 1996–2007
- Label: Out of Orion
- Formerly of: Alienated Buddha

Juan Antonio Arguelles Rius (November 2, 1978 – June 3, 2007), also known as Arguru (sometimes Argu), was a prolific music software programmer and electronic musician, producer and songwriter, responsible for such applications as NoiseTrekker and Directwave. Worked for the company discoDSP and was later hired by Image-Line and involved in the development of Deckadance and FL Studio 7. Arguru died in a car accident on June 3, 2007.

== Biography ==
Juan Antonio Arguelles was born on November 2, 1978, in Málaga, Spain. In 1997, Arguru started out as one of the most productive plugin developers of the Jeskola buzz-scene. In 2000, he and Frank Cobos (known as "Freaky") began mixing psytrance as a duo in Malaga under the name Alienated Buddha. They released the album Inpsyde on Out of Orion in February 2002. In May 2000 he created Psycle until version 1.0, which he then released into the public domain.

Arguru worked for the software company discoDSP with George Reales since July 2002. discoDSP is known for developing audio plugins such as Discovery, Discovery Pro, Vertigo, Bliss, Phantom and Corona. Discovery is notable for being the first commercial VSTi plugin that was available on both Windows and Linux. He left the company in 2004 to begin working for Image-Line. While at Image-Line, he contributed to the development of FL Studio and was the primary programmer for the DJ software Deckadance, released in 2007.

=== Other projects ===
- Aodix 1,2 and 3 were basic sequencer programs that used the amiga style "tracker" interface, with an integrated sampler and integrated synth that were progressively dropped in favor of a VST host.
- Aodix 4 is a digital audio workstation program that is advertised as "the ultimate bridge between tracking and sequencing", co-authored with Zafer Kantar, and with the participation of Paul Merchant and Marc De Haar. Aodix 4 brought several innovative technologies to trackers such as pattern zoom and subtick timing and VST support with modular routing. Aodix 4 was a commercial software at its first release, but was re-released as freeware after the death of Juan Antonio.
- NoiseTrekker was a Windows tracker with MIDI, internal synth, 2 TB-303s and DSP support featuring a classic amiga-style interface. NoiseTrekker code was used as a basis for the first version of Renoise, one of the most modern and actively developed music trackers.
- Psycle is a complete modular music creation environment with a tracker interface. Versions up to 1.0 were created by Arguru. After that it was released into the public domain, development was continued by other people. Current versions are released under GNU GPL and available for all major platforms.

== Death ==
On June 3, 2007, near the city of Benalmádena (Málaga, Spain), Arguru was driving when he lost control and crashed into an RV, dying in the accident. His funeral was on June 4, 2007, in the park cemetery of Malaga. The whole music software community was shocked by Arguru's unexpected death, and showed their strong support to Arguru's relatives.

== Discography ==
- Inpsyde by Alienated Buddha (Out of Orion, 2002)

== Legacy ==
- In 2007, deadmau5 and Chris Lake wrote an instrumental titled "Arguru" for the album Random Album Title in memory of Arguru.
- The Aodix source code was released as an archive with permission from Zafer Kantar, who worked with Arguru on the software. The code was reconstructed from a 2005 backup and decompiled executables. An enhanced version with bug fixes and improved plugin compatibility continues to be maintained.
