= Google Base =

Defunct Google database

- Website type: Database
- Dissolved: June 1, 2011; 15 years ago
- Creator: Google
- Launched: November 16, 2005; 20 years ago
- Current status: Discontinued

Google Base was a database provided by Google which allowed users to add content such as text, images, and structured information in formats such as XML, PDF, Excel, RTF, or WordPerfect. Google Base was launched in 2005 and downgraded to Google Merchant Center in September 2010.

If Google found user-added content relevant, submitted content appeared on its shopping search engine, Google Maps or even the web search. The piece of content could then be labeled with attributes like the ingredients for a recipe or the camera model for stock photography. Because information about the service was leaked before public release, it generated much interest in the information technology community prior to release. Google subsequently responded on their blog with an official statement:

"You may have seen stories today reporting on a new product that we're testing, and speculating about our plans. Here's what's really going on. We are testing a new way for content owners to submit their content to Google, which we hope will complement existing methods such as our web crawl and Google Sitemaps. We think it's an exciting product, and we'll let you know when there's more news."

Files could be uploaded to the Google Base servers by browsing your computer or the web, by various FTP methods, or by API coding. Online tools were provided to view the number of downloads of the user's files, and other performance measures.

On December 17, 2010, it was announced that Google Base's API is deprecated in favor of a set of new APIs known as Google Shopping APIs.

== See also ==
- List of Google services and tools
- Resources of a Resource – ROR
