= FL Studio Mobile =

Digital audio workstation application

- FL Studio Mobile version 3
- Developer: Image-Line
- Release: 21 June 2011; 15 years ago
- Stable release: 4.0.0 / 28 March 2022; 4 years ago
- Operating system: Android, ChromeOS, iOS & macOS, Microsoft Windows
- Available in: English
- Type: Digital audio workstation
- License: Proprietary
- Website: www.image-line.com/fl-studio-mobile/

FL Studio Mobile is a digital audio workstation available for Android, iOS and Windows UWP.

The program allows for the creation of complete multi-track music production projects, which can then be exported in WAV, MP3 and MIDI formats, to work with other digital audio workstations, or in FLM project format to be opened in FL Studio 10.0.5 or later. Various features include a step sequencer, piano roll, keyboard, drum pad, track editor, effects, and 133 sampled instruments including synths and drum kits. Instruments can also be added as .zip or .instr files.

== Release ==
On June 21, 2011, Image-Line released FL Studio Mobile and FL Studio Mobile HD, versions of their Windows digital audio workstation FL Studio. FL Studio Mobile was designed by Artua and developed in cooperation with the makers of Music Studio. Image-Line released the program at an introductory price of $15.99 ($19.99 for the HD version), and both versions were available for download at the App Store. In October 2016 Image-Line released FL Studio Mobile 3 on Android via the Google Play Store, and two months later on iOS via the App Store and Windows via the Microsoft Store. FL Studio Mobile 3 was a completely new application developed in-house at Image-Line, replacing the existing Artua developed versions. The price was revised downward to US$14.99.

FL Studio Mobile 1.0 is compatible with devices that operate iOS 3.1.3 or later, specifically all iPhones and iPod Touch models. iPad 1 and iPad 2 can run either FL Studio Mobile or FL Studio Mobile HD, and the HD version requires iOS 4.2 or later. The iPhone 4 version includes Retina Display support.

== Features ==
Track editor

The program has a track editor mode that supports 99 layered tracks. Features include adding, duplicating, and deleting tracks, changing the track's instruments, setting song signature and tempo, an effect bus setting, a pan knob, a volume fader, and mute and solo buttons.

Piano roll editor

The piano roll editor allows for manually drawing notes, selecting multiple notes by dragging a rectangle, changing the length of multiple notes at once, setting note volume, and moving, duplicating, and quantizing notes.

Step sequencer

The step sequencer allows for recording one measure of a melody or beat at a time, then turning it into a loop. It allows for the creation of multiple sounds in one instrument track, and adjusting the pitch and velocity of each individual step.

Keyboard and drum pad

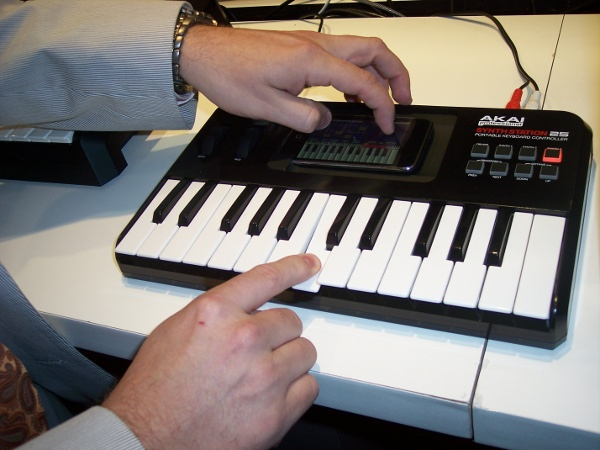
Akai SynthStation 25 (left hand is touching connected iPhone)

The keyboard feature is both resizable and stackable, allowing for 5 simultaneous touches, and 10 touches on the iPad. It has 3 key label modes, fullscreen support, melody and loop recording, two device orientations, and a fully configurable metronome. Pitch-bend and velocity can be applied to notes entered with the keyboard, drum pads or the piano-roll editor. The non-HD version is compatible with the Akai SynthStation 25, a plug-in piano keyboard for iPhone and iPod Touch.

Instruments

Version 1.0 comes built in with 133 sampled instruments, which cover musical styles such as classical, jazz, rock, electronic, and others. There are synths and drum kits included, as well as Slicex Loops. Pitchbend can be controlled with device tilt. iOS, and therefore FL Studio Mobile, does not support VST plugins. As of version 1.1, user instruments can be created using .instr and .zip files.

Effects

Version 1.0 comes with 5 real-time effects, including reverb, delay to create echo, equalizer, amp simulator with two overdrive types, and filter with resonance and optional tilt control. There is also a limiter for song volume. Effects can be turned on or off on an individual channel or applied to an entire project.

=== Importing and exporting ===
Version 1.0 doesn't support importing samples, though Image-Line has announced that future updates will incorporate the feature. The program supports iTunes file sharing, and audio can be exported in WAV and MIDI formats so they can be worked on in other digital audio workstations. Projects can be saved in .FLM format and then loaded onto Microsoft Windows to be opened with FL Studio version 10.0.5. or later. This can be done either on a Windows PC running FL studio natively, or an Apple computer using either Boot Camp or virtualization.

== Version history ==
Version	Release	FL Studio Mobile
1.0.0	June 21, 2011	For all iOS devices, with HD for iPad and iPad 2. 133 preset instruments and five real-time effects included. Project files can be exported to be used in FL Studio.
1.0.5	2011	For all iOS devices, with HD for iPad and iPad 2. 133 preset instruments and five real-time effects included. Project files can be exported to be used in FL Studio.
1.1.0	July 23, 2011	Added ability to create user instruments from .instr and .zip files. Record button added to filter screen, and filter track editing added to bar editor. Using Sonoma AudioCopy, audio can be sent to other apps via Export.
1.2.0	December 20, 2011	Custom Instrument Button (on Instruments list). AudioPaste. Swing (in the Step Editor). SoundCloud export/upload. AAC (.m4a) export. All WAV formats now supported for sample import. Numerous bugfixes & performance enhancements.
1.2.1	January 6, 2012	AudioPaste: an arbitrary sample name can be entered. In the SoundCloud popup window, the user name can be tapped to log out. Bug fixes.
1.3.1	June 21, 2014	For all Android and iOS devices, with HD for iPad and iPad 2. 133 preset instruments and five real-time effects included. Audio tracks and wave editor, along with MiniSynth plugin synthesizer. Background audio (playback while the app runs in the background). Projects (in .flm format) are compatible between Android and iOS, if audio tracks are present they are ignored. If instruments are not available the MIDI data is loaded and then a default instrument is used. Project files can be exported to desktop version of FL Studio.
Android 2.0 iOS 2.4	September 2014	For the Android version, Audio Tracks, Wave editor, and Audio Recording have been added. Many small tweaks, improvements, and bug fixes have been implemented. For the iOS devices, with HD for iPad and iPad 2. 133 preset instruments and five real-time effects included. Audio tracks and wave editor, along with MiniSynth plugin synthesizer. Background audio (playback while the app runs in the background). Projects (in .flm format) are compatible between Android and iOS, if audio tracks are present they are ignored. If instruments are not available the MIDI data is loaded and the a default instrument is used. Project files can be exported to desktop version of FL Studio.
3.0	December 2016	Because of development issues between the IOS and Android versions, FL Mobile 3 was a complete ground-up rewrite that departs radically from previous versions. The update was a free update from the previous version with FL Mobile being able to load FLM 2 files, although the results might not be identical soundwise due to the architecture change.
4.0	March 2022	New modules: Slicer, Multiband compressor. Workflow features: Scale-locked keyboard, Scale guess in the piano roll, Gain and Mix controls for every module, Timeline selection rendering, Recovery for recently deleted files, Audiobus 3 compatibility on iOS, Sample-accurate latency compensation (iOS and MacOS). UI updates: Themes, New shop, Sample preview in the Browser, Improved mouse support (Hover animations, right-click actions, scroll in the Playlist), Computer keyboard navigation: escape to dismiss popups, enter to accept prompts, tab and shift-tab to iterate through controls. Continuous scrolling during playback, CPU meter (aka Buffer Health meter). Content: 2 new free products (Essential Pianos, Drumful Treasure), New paid products (Oldschool Breakbeats), New factory presets (Limiter), New demo project Parrik

== See also ==
- Sytrus
