= Hreflang =

HTML meta element

The rel="alternate" hreflang="x" link attribute is a HTML meta element described in RFC 8288. Hreflang specifies the language and optional geographic restrictions for a document. Hreflang is interpreted by search engines and can be used by webmasters to clarify the lingual and geographical targeting of a website.

== Purpose ==
Many websites are targeted at audience with different languages and localized for different countries. This can cause a lot of duplicate content or near duplicate content, as well as targeting issues with users from search engines.

Search engines use hreflang to understand the lingual and geographical targeting of websites and use the information to show the right URL in search results, depending on user language and region preference.

There are 3 basic scenarios that can be covered with hreflang:

- Same country, different languages
- Different countries, different languages
- Different countries, same language

Hreflang attribute help your website deliver multiple variations of the website in different languages.

== Implementation ==
Hreflang can be implemented in 3 different ways.

- link element in HTML <head>
- HTTP header
- XML sitemaps

The hreflang definition is done by creating a full set of all language and region specific versions of the same document. Every URL in the set must reference the full URL set. A self-reference is required, so the including document has to be always part of the URL set.

=== Language and country codes ===
Hreflang accepts values that define languages ISO 639-1 and countries (ISO 3166-1). A language or a combination of language and region can be used as a value. A country-only value is not allowed.

Language Example
en
fr
be

Language and Region Example
fr-CA
en-CA
en-US

The hreflang value has to follow the standard in order to be used by search engines.

=== Language script variations ===
RFC 5646 allows language script variations as value for hreflang. Language script variations can directly be addressed using ISO 15924.

Examples
zh-Hant: Chinese (Traditional)
zh-Hans: Chinese (Simplified)

=== x-default ===
x-default is a reserved hreflang value that can be used to specify a default version for a document. The x-default URL is not targeted at a specific region and/or language and is supposed to be shown to unspecified users. Google suggests defining an x-default version in each URL set, which will be shown to users from unspecified regions or languages in search results. Typically, in multilingual websites, the TLD (https://www.example.com) will get the x-default value in each URL set and the language folders/subdomains will be assigned hreflang values.

The URL that is defined as the x-default for a certain document, can also be specified for a certain language or language and region at the same time.

== Markup examples ==
=== HTML ===
<link rel="alternate" hreflang="en-US" href="http://example.com/page.html">

<html>
    <head>
        <link rel="alternate" hreflang="en-US" href="http://example.com/page.html">
        <link rel="alternate" hreflang="en-CA" href="http://example.com/en-ca/page.html">
        <link rel="alternate" hreflang="en-GB" href="http://example.com/en-gb/page.html">
        <link rel="alternate" hreflang="fr-CA" href="http://example.com/fr-ca/page.html">
        <link rel="alternate" hreflang="x-default" href="http://example.com/page.html">
    </head>
    <body>
    ...
    </body>
</html>

=== HTTP ===
HTTP/1.1 200 OK
Content-Type: application/pdf
Link: <http://example.com/page.pdf>; rel="alternate";hreflang="x-default", <http://uk.example.com/page.pdf>; rel="alternate";hreflang="en-GB",
<http://us.example.com/page.pdf>; rel="alternate";hreflang="en-US"
...

=== XML sitemaps ===
<?xml version="1.0" encoding="UTF-8"?>
<urlset xmlns="http://www.sitemaps.org/schemas/sitemap/0.9"
  xmlns:xhtml="http://www.w3.org/1999/xhtml">
<url>
    <loc>http://example.com/page.html</loc>
    <xhtml:link
                 rel="alternate"
                 hreflang="en-US"
                 href="http://us.example.com/page.html"
                 />
    <xhtml:link
                 rel="alternate"
                 hreflang="en-GB"
                 href="http://uk.example.com/page.html"
                 />
    <xhtml:link
                 rel="alternate"
                 hreflang="x-default"
                 href="http://example.com/page.html"
                 />
</url>
<url>
    <loc>http://us.example.com/page.html</loc>
    <xhtml:link
                 rel="alternate"
                 hreflang="en-GB"
                 href="http://uk.example.com/page.html"
                 />
    <xhtml:link
                 rel="alternate"
                 hreflang="x-default"
                 href="http://example.com/page.html"
                 />
    <xhtml:link
                 rel="alternate"
                 hreflang="en-US"
                 href="http://us.example.com/page.html"
                 />
</url>
<url>
    <loc>http://uk.example.com/page.html</loc>
    <xhtml:link
                 rel="alternate"
                 hreflang="en-US"
                 href="http://us.example.com/page.html"
                 />
    <xhtml:link
                 rel="alternate"
                 hreflang="x-default"
                 href="http://example.com/page.html"
                 />
    <xhtml:link
                 rel="alternate"
                 hreflang="en-GB"
                 href="http://uk.example.com/page.html"
                 />
</url>
</urlset>
...
