= Harmor =

Software synthesizer

- Developer: Image-Line Software
- Initial release: 26 October 2011; 14 years ago
- Written in: Delphi
- Operating system: Microsoft Windows macOS
- Type: Software synthesizer
- License: Proprietary
- Website: image-line.com/plugins/Synths/Harmor

Harmor is a software synthesizer created by Image-Line Software for the music production program FL Studio. It is available as a demo version within the software; however, it must be purchased separately (or bought in the FL Studio All Plugins Edition bundle) in order to save projects that contain Harmor instances. Harmor is an upgraded and more elaborate version of its predecessor, Harmless. It was originally released with a 32-bit engine and upgraded to a 64-bit engine in 2013.

== Features ==
=== Additive synthesis engine ===
Harmor is powered by an additive synthesis engine, similar to Image-Line’s synthesizer Morphine. Although the different additive modules and controls found in Harmor can look similar to more conventional synthesizers that utilize subtractive synthesis, its sound generation engine differs in that it sums its partials later in the signal chain (right before the FX stage) compared to some other additive synthesizers. This means that the timbre, filters, harmonizer, phaser, equalizer, and more are all done additively. Furthermore, lots of these additive parameters can also be individually controlled per each unison voice, and the way these additive modules affect harmonics can often be changed according to custom shapes, masks, and harmonic distribution graphs in the envelope section using line editors. This enables a greater amount of harmonic control before partials are summed.

Harmor can produce up to 520 partials per note, per unison voice, in each part (512 partials, 3 sub-harmonics, and the filter self-resonance oscillator). Imported audio (WAV, AIFF, WavPack, MP3, Ogg, REX1&2) and image (BMP, JPEG, PNG, GIF) files can also be resynthesized quite faithfully, and some of their parameters can be edited such as time stretching, pitch shifting, and formants, in addition to the full amplitude, pitch and phase harmonic-level manipulation enabled by the additive parameters described above. Harmor’s spectrogram (visual feedback panel) can also be revealed to show partials sent to the synthesis engine and display their behavior in real-time.

=== General and advanced GUI features ===
Although Harmor is internally an additive synthesizer, most of its controls found on the main GUI are presented in a way that is familiar to subtractive synthesis users. This is the reason why Image-Line calls it an additive / subtractive synthesizer.

Starting off at the top left of the interface, two timbres, a saw and square wave, can be morphed or used independently when creating a sound. These are the default waveforms when Harmor is opened, but they can be edited or changed by either importing any single-cycle waveform or additively editing their timbre in the envelope section below using the line editor. Reverb and preverb effects can be created additively by using the blur knob, which smears the partials horizontally and adds harmonic attack or release, while partial frequencies themselves can also be blurred vertically using the harmonic blur control. Located directly below the blur module, the prism knob is the main way to control the pitch of partials, which is useful for creating a detuned or harsh sound. Partials are shifted from their original frequency according to the selected harmonic level to prism amount. To the right of the prism controls is the harmonizer module, which essentially accentuates the volume of certain harmonics according the configurable harmonizer pattern matrix and the three other harmonizer controls. To the right of the harmonizer is the unison section, which enables the control of unison voices and their spread in pitch, pan and phase.

Especially useful for creating a string-like sound, the pluck knob uses another kind of filter to impact the decay rate of a sound's partials. By default, this simulates an effect of a string being plucked; however, any sound created in Harmor can be emulated in that fashion. To the right of the pluck controls, a phaser unit is also available. By default, Harmor's phaser is essentially an endlessly rolling notch filter, which can be extensively shaped, manipulated and even keytracked. Below the harmonizer are some parameters controlling note frequency and partials multipliers and dividers, as well as vibrato. The Global Controls section of Harmor's GUI controls a variety of effects more related to the performance of notes rather than the timbre of the sound. Articulation of notes is strongly effected by the legato and strum controls. An A/B switch can also be found, and allows the user to switch between the two independent parts that can be mixed and modulated separately. Finally, the processing order of the different additive modules and elements can be changed in the advanced tab.

The depth of the final sound output can therefore be very deep and complex due to all these factors controlling more characteristics of the sound, especially considering the fact that the behavior of most of those additive modules can also be customized in the envelope section using line editors (i.e. filter shape, prism shape, pluck shape, phaser shape, harmonizer distribution, etc.).

=== Modulation ===
Harmor offers the option of being able to draw one’s own modulation source curve using the line editor for the following available source types:

- Envelopes
- LFOs
- Keyboard and velocity mapping
- XYZ controller
- Random mapping
- Unison index mapping (individual unison voice control for the targeted parameter)
- Held index mapping
- Mod X speed mapping

These modulation types can be applied to any articulated control, which are all available on the left-side section of the editor target menu. Articulations are again applied to each individual partial simultaneously, rather than the final compilation of partials in a sound.

=== Audio effects ===
Harmor is equipped with various more traditional audio effects to alter its sound after partials have been computed. It comes with distortion, chorus, delay, reverb, and comp (compression/limiting). All of these effects can be individually tweaked by various factors relating to that particular effect. The comp effect is powered by Maximus, a plugin by Image-Line.

== System requirements ==
- Windows 7 and 8, Vista, XP (SP2) - (32 and 64 bit OS)
- 2 GHz AMD or Intel Pentium 3 compatible CPU with full SSE1 support
- 512 MB RAM
- 30 MB free disc space
- DirectSound or ASIO compatible soundcard

== See also ==
- Sytrus
