= Image-Line =

Belgian software development company

- Type: Private
- Industry: Software Music
- Founded: 1994; 32 years ago Belgium
- Headquarters: Ghent
- Key people: Jean-Marie Cannie (Founder, CTO); Frank Van Biesen (Founder, COO)
- Products: FL Studio / FL Studio Mobile; Deckadance; EZGenerator
- Website: image-line.com

Image-Line Software (commonly known as simply Image-Line) is a Belgian software company best known for its digital audio workstation program FL Studio and FL Studio Mobile as well as related audio plugins such as Sytrus and Harmor. Image-Line was founded in 1994. In 2007, Image-Line introduced Deckadance, a virtual DJ console application. The company also produced EZGenerator, a template-based web editing program.

== History ==
=== Early development ===
Image-Line was founded by Jean-Marie Cannie and Frank Van Biesen, who after seven years of creating stock market software for Pavell Software, decided in 1992 to branch into video games. Their first product was an adult video game based on Tetris, which they then offered on floppy disks in the ad section of Computer Magazine. Around this time CD-ROM games such as The 7th Guest were becoming popular, inspiring Van Biesen and Cannie to begin working with Private, one of the larger producers of adult video games at the time. Private released multiple Image-Line CD-ROM games, including Private Prison and Private Castle. The company officially adopted the name Image-Line in 1994.

=== Didier "Gol" Dambrin ===
Around the time they released the games for Private, IBM launched the "Da Vinci" contest where the first prizes were color laptops. Image-Line, which at the time had little money, won the contest in the multimedia category after reworking one of their game environments to fit the contest criteria.

Image-Line took an interest in Didier "Gol" Dambrin, the developer who won the overall Da Vinci contest as well as the Game category. They hired the 19-year-old to work for them, and his first game for the company was the game Private Investigator. Dambrin's next project for Image-Line was the platform game Eat This, a shoot 'em up game that involved killing aliens.

Other Image-Line developers created products such as the invoicing program Fact2000 and E-OfficeDirect, a content-based web tool that would be a precursor to their later product EZGenerator. Image-Line also topped the Belgian game charts 4 years in a row with their CD version of the Belgian TV game show Blokken.

=== Audio software ===
In 1997, Dambrin gained an interest in music applications of the time such as Hammerhead and Rebirth 338, and developed a simple MIDI-only drum machine in an effort to merge the two products into a step sequencer that utilized both rows and steps. Dubbed Fruity Loops 1.0, the program didn't fit with Image-Line's other product lines of the time. However, the demo version released in December 1997 became so popular that the number of downloads quickly overwhelmed the Image-Line servers. To gather income to support their servers, Image-Line had Dambrin develop an EJay clone called FruityTracks. Image-Line then served as the program's OEM for Mattel. The program was released as Pro-DJ in France and the UK, and Radio 538 Music Machine in The Netherlands and Belgium.

Image-Line continued to develop the FruityLoops application from a simple drum machine loop into a large and complex DAW. FruityLoops was eventually renamed FL Studio for branding purposes and to avoid a prolonged trademark dispute in the United States with Kellogg's. FL Studio is now one of the most popular software production systems in the world, and Image-Line's flagship program. A multitude of plug-ins have been developed by Image-Line to work with FL Studio, including synthesizers such as Sytrus and effects plugins such as Maximus and Edison. In 2007 Image-Line released Deckadance, a DJ mixing program developed by programmer Arguru. Deckadance works as both a stand-alone program and as an FL Studio plugin.

=== Other software ===
Beyond audio products, Image-Line developed and distributed EZGenerator, a software program for website design and maintenance. EZGenerator has won multiple awards since its release.

== Products ==
Software	Release	Notes
FL Studio	1998–present	Image-Line's flagship digital audio workstation. The most recent major version is FL Studio 2025, released on July 10, 2025.
FL Studio Mobile	2011–present	Released June 21, 2011, a version of FL Studio for iOS and on April 17, 2013, for Android
Deckadance	2007–2015	A DJ console and mixing tool, similar to Scratch LIVE and Traktor. Version 2.43 is the most recent release from Image-Line. Deckadance was sold to Stanton/Gibson in 2015. Their latest release is Deckadance 2.72
EZGenerator	1998–2017	A template-based web editing program, and a natural progression of their earlier E-OfficeDirect program, EZGenerator has won numerous software awards. No longer sold.
Fact2000	1997–2012	An invoicing and contact management program. No longer sold for use.
FruityTracks	1999–2000	A track mixing program. No longer sold (was integrated into FL Studio).

Video games	Release	Notes
Porntris	1992	An erotic version of the popular Tetris game.
Private Investigator	1996	Awarded 1996 Best Interactive Game at the AMEE Award Show in Las Vegas.
Eat This	1998	A side-scrolling "run and gun" shooter computer game that involves killing aliens with machine guns. While the original release was 2-D, the later version had 30 minutes of 3D animated video.
Blokken	1998–2001	A CD-ROM equivalent to the Belgian quiz show "Blokken" released in Belgium. The game topped the Belgian game charts 4 years in a row, and was released in four versions. It has sold over 50,000 copies.

Virtual Effects	Release	Notes
Gross Beat	-	A time-, pitch-, and volume-manipulation effect.
Maximus	-	Maximus is a multi-band audio limiter and compressor for mastering projects or tracks. It also serves as a noise gate, expander, ducker, and de-esser,
Hardcore	-	A multi-effects suite of plugins designed to resemble guitarists' stompboxes.
Juice Pack	-	A collection of Image-Line proprietary plugins ported to VST format for use in other music hosts. The contents of this pack has changed since its release; at the time of this writing it includes the Delay, Delay Bank, EQUO, Flangus, LovePhilter, Multiband Compressor, Notebook, Parametric EQ, Parametric EQ 2, Spectroman, Stereo Enhancer, Vocoder, Wave Candy, and Wave Shaper plugins.
Edison	2007–present	A wave editor in VST format that also function as a standalone program.
Pitcher	-	A real time pitch correction filter – similar to Antares Autotune.
NewTone	-	A piano roll pitch correction effect – similar to Melodyne.
Vocodex	2009–present	A digital vocoder developed by Didier Dambrin.
Fruity Stereo Shaper	2009–present	A stereo processor with a mixer for left/right channels and their inverted equivalents, and controls for channel delay and phase offset.

Virtual Instruments	Release	Notes
Sytrus	2003–present	A hybrid, semi-modular synthesizer combining subtractive, additive, and FM synthesis.
DirectWave	2005–present	A software sampler that provides sample recording, waveform editing, and DSP effects.
SliceX	2008–present	A beat-slicing sampler for processing and re-arranging recorded drumloops.
Harmless	2009–present	Simplified additive synthesizer with a unique signal chain.
Harmor	2011–present	Advanced Version of Harmless along with waveform views, envelopes, LFOs, and modulation mappings from Sytrus.
Toxic Biohazard	-	A virtual FM synthesizer similar to Sytrus.
Sawer	-	A vintage-modeling synthesizer; Sawer attempts to emulate old Soviet Union-era subtractive synthesizers.
Morphine	-	An easy-to-program additive synthesizer.
PoiZone	-	An easy-to-program subtractive synthesizer.
Ogun/Autogun	2009–present	Ogun is An advanced additive synthesizer specialized in creating metallic timbres, while Autogun – a free version of Ogun limited to semi-random preset generation.
Sakura	2009–present	A physical-modeling synthesizer designed to emulate string instruments.
Drumaxx	2010–present	Percussion synthesizer.
Groove Machine	2011–present	Step sequencer with the ability to automate all parameters per-step.
Wasp/Wasp XT	2002–present	A "broad" analogue emulation synthesizer, intended to emulate analogue synthesizers in general.
SimSynth Live	2002–present	Three oscillator synthesizer with Oberheim-inspired SVF filter.
DX10	2002–present	FM Synthesizer that features low CPU usage.
DrumSynth Live	2007–present	Drum synthesizer based on two noise generators run through band pass filters. VSTi version of the standalone program by Maxim Digital Audio.
