= Beat detection =

Software for detecting musical beats

In signal analysis, beat detection is using computer software or computer hardware to detect the beat of a musical score. There are many methods available and beat detection is always a tradeoff between accuracy and speed. Beat detectors are common in music visualization software such as some media player plugins. The algorithms used may utilize simple statistical models based on sound energy or may involve sophisticated comb filter networks or other means. They may be fast enough to run in real time or may be so slow as to only be able to analyze short sections of songs.

Frequency Selected Statistical Sound Energy Beat Detection: A 5-minute explanation about how a simple software beat detector works, including graphs that show the internal state of the beat detector.

== See also ==
- Pitch detection
