= Web indexing =

Methods for indexing the Internet

Web indexing, or Internet indexing, comprises methods for indexing the contents of a website or of the Internet as a whole. Individual websites or intranets may use a back-of-the-book index, while search engines usually use keywords and metadata to provide a more useful vocabulary for Internet or onsite searching. With the increase in the number of periodicals that have articles online, web indexing is also becoming important for periodical websites.

Back-of-the-book-style web indexes may be called "web site A-Z indexes". The implication with "A-Z" is that there is an alphabetical browse view or interface. This interface differs from that of a browse through layers of hierarchical categories (also known as a taxonomy) which are not necessarily alphabetical, but are also found on some web sites. Although an A-Z index could be used to index multiple sites, rather than the multiple pages of a single site, this is unusual.

Metadata web indexing involves assigning keywords, description or phrases to web pages or web sites within a metadata tag (or "meta-tag") field, so that the web page or web site can be retrieved with a list. This method is commonly used by search engine indexing.

== See also ==
- Automatic indexing
- Information architecture
- Search engine optimization
- Google Webmaster
- Site map
- Web navigation
- Web search engine
- Information retrieval
