= Home page =

Main page of a website

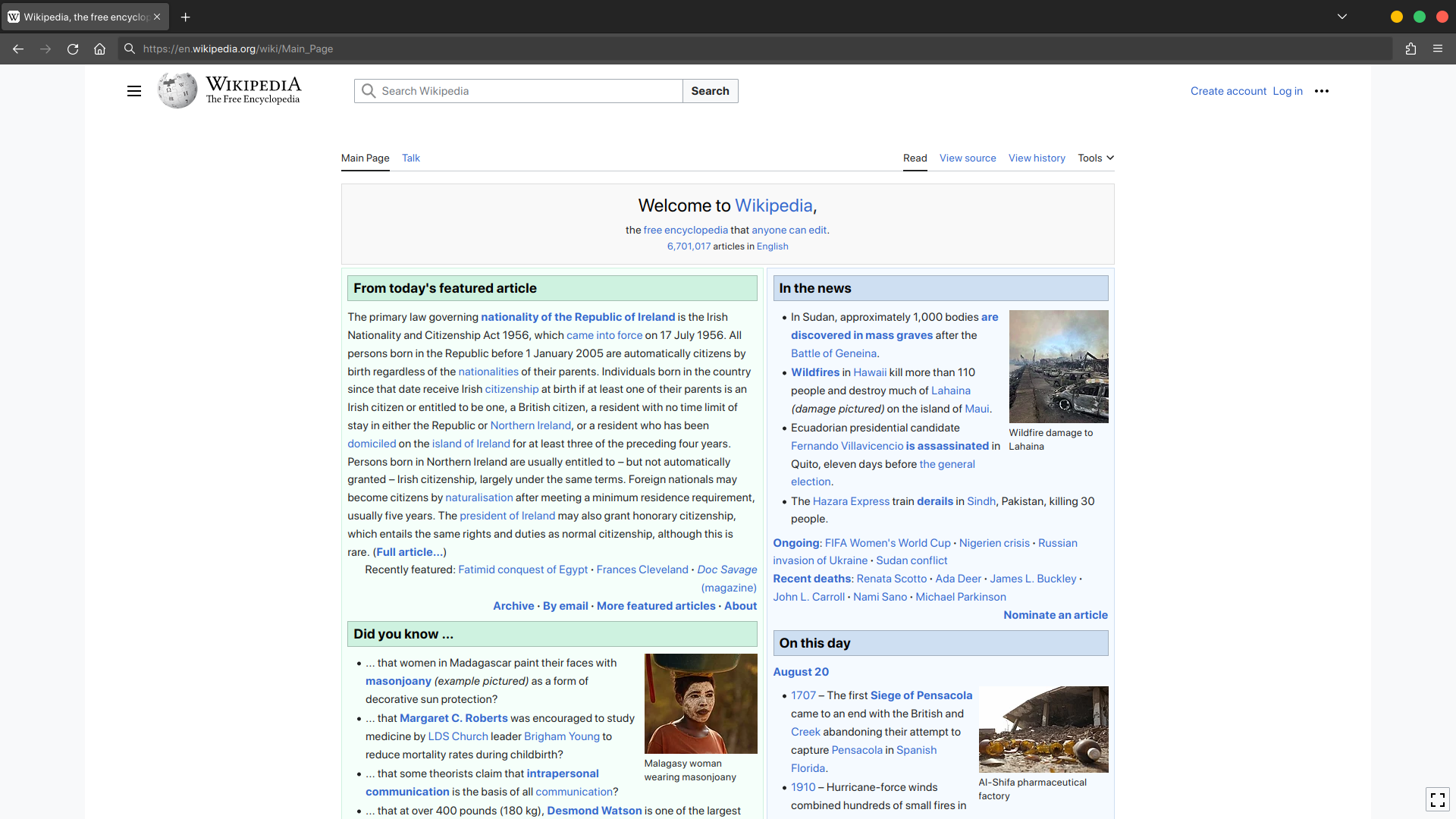
The home page of the English Wikipedia (in 2023) is displayed in a web browser. The small house-shaped button in the upper left is for the browser's start page.

A home page (or homepage) is the main web page of a website. Usually, the home page is located at the root of the website's domain or subdomain. For example, if the domain is example.com, the home page is likely located at the URL www.example.com/.

The term may also refer to the start page shown in a web browser when the application first opens.

== Function ==
A home page is the main web page that a visitor will view when they navigate to a website via a search engine, and it may also function as a landing page to attract visitors. In some cases, the home page is a site directory, particularly when a website has multiple home pages.

Good home page design is usually a high priority for a website; for example, a news website may curate headlines and first paragraphs of top stories, with links to full articles. According to Homepage Usability, the home page is the "most important page on any website" and receives the most views of any page. A poorly designed home page can overwhelm and deter visitors from the site. One important use of home pages is communicating the identity and value of a company.

== Browser start page ==
When a web browser is launched, it will automatically open at least one web page. This is the browser's start page, which is also called its home page.

Start pages can be a website or a special browser page, such as thumbnails of frequently visited websites. Moreover, there is a niche market of websites intended to be used solely as start pages.

== See also ==
- Contact page
- Site map
