= ITools Resourceome =

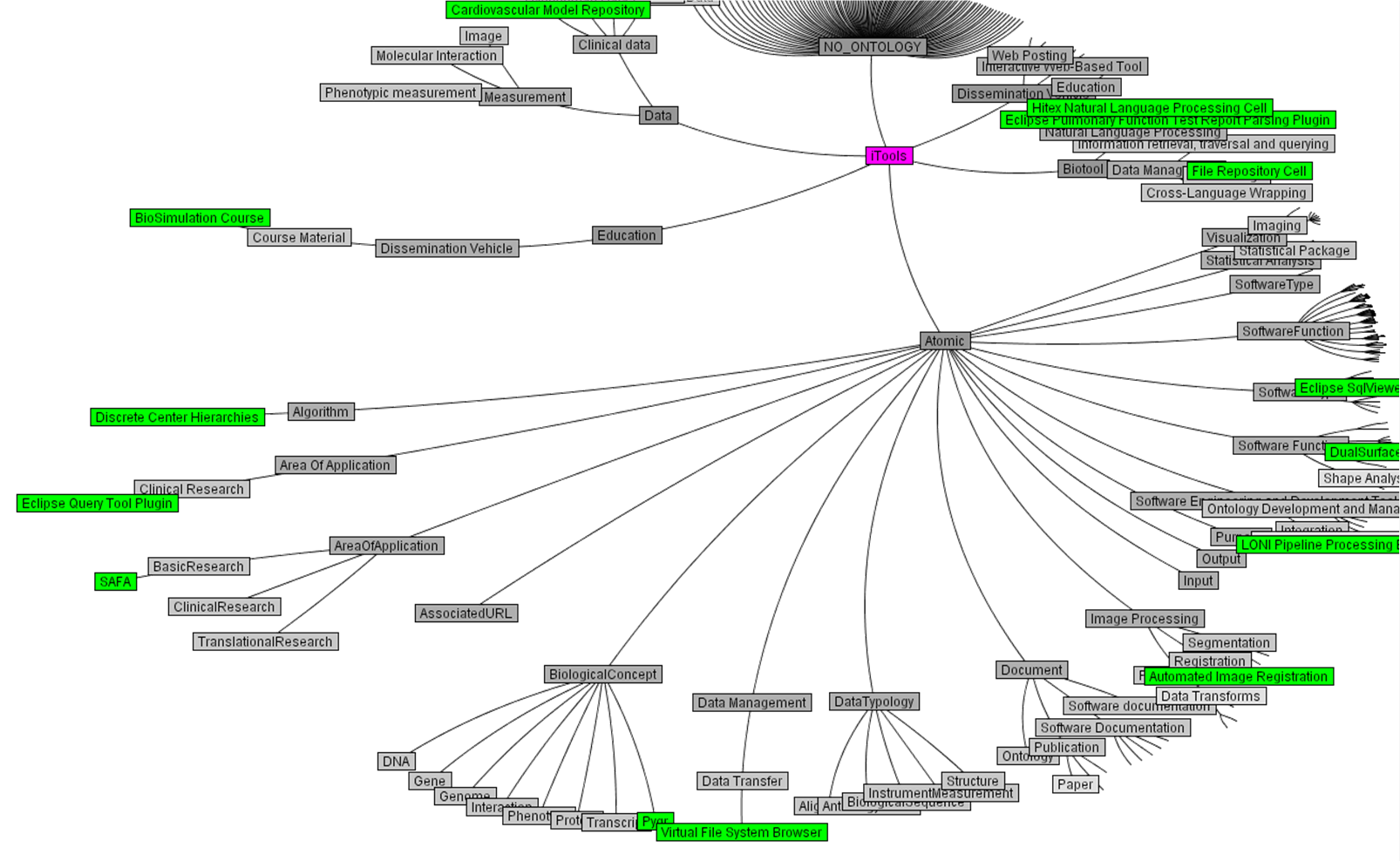
NCBC iTools

iTools is a distributed infrastructure for managing, discovery, comparison and integration of computational biology resources. iTools employs Biositemap technology to retrieve and service meta-data about diverse bioinformatics data services, tools, and web-services. iTools is developed by the National Centers for Biomedical Computing as part of the NIH Road Map Initiative.

== See also ==
- Biositemaps
