= Contact page =

Page in a website that lists contacting methods

A contact page is a common web page on a website for visitors to contact the organization or individual providing the website.

The content of a contact page typically includes one or more of the following elements:

- an email address for direct communication
- a telephone number for voice contact
- a postal address, sometimes accompanied by a Map or embedded map widget to indicate the location
- Links to social media profiles, such as Facebook, Twitter, LinkedIn, or Instagram
- a contact form for sending messages, inquiries, or requests without using an external email client
- Office hours or availability times for customer service or support
- Frequently asked questions (FAQs) or links to help resources
- Directions or guidance for visitors to physical locations

In the case of large organizations, the contact page may provide information for several offices (headquarters, field offices, etc.) and departments (customer support, sales, investor relations, press relations, etc.).

== See also ==
- Home page
- Site map
