= Google Search Console =

Web service from Google for webmasters

- Website type: Webmaster tools
- Owner: Google
- Website: search.google.com/search-console
- Commercial: yes
- Launched: 2006; 20 years ago

"Google Search Console" (formerly Google Webmaster Tools) is a web service by Google which allows webmasters to check indexing status, search queries, crawling errors and optimize visibility of their websites.

Until 20 May 2015, the service was called Google Webmaster Tools. In January 2018, Google introduced a new version of the search console, with changes to the user interface. In September 2019, old Search Console reports, including the home and dashboard pages, were removed.

Since 2019, Search Console has supported Domain properties, which combine all protocol and subdomain variations (such as http, https, www, and non-www) into a single property, simplifying site management and reporting.

== Features ==
The service includes tools that let webmasters

- Submit and check an XML sitemap.
- Check the crawl rate, and view statistics about when Googlebot accesses a particular site.
- Receive alerts when Google encounters indexing, spam, or other issues on your site.
- Analyze search performance, including clicks, impressions, click-through rate (CTR), and average search position for queries, pages, countries, devices, and search appearance types.
- Inspect individual URLs to view Google's indexed version of a page, including crawl status, indexing information, canonical URL selection, structured data detection, and live URL testing.
- Show you which sites link to your website.
- Write and check a robots.txt file to help discover pages that are blocked in robots.txt accidentally.
- List internal and external pages that link to the website.
- Get a list of links which Googlebot had difficulty in crawling, including the error that Googlebot received when accessing the URLs in question.
- Set a preferred domain (e.g. prefer example.com over www.example.com or vice versa), which determines how the site URL is displayed in SERPs.
- Highlight to Google Search elements of structured data which are used to enrich search hit entries (released in December 2012 as Google Data Highlighter).
- View site speed reports from the Chrome User Experience Report.
- Page Experience Report including - Core Web Vitals, and HTTPS.
- Receive notifications from Google for manual penalties.
- Provide access to an API to add, change and delete listings and list crawl errors.
- Check the security issues if there are any with the website. (Hacked Site or Malware Attacks)
- Add or remove the property owners and associates of the web property.

== See also ==
- Bing Webmaster Tools
- Google Insights for Search
- Google Analytics
- Schema.org
- Google Tag Manager
- Google PageSpeed
- Google Optimize
