= Sytrus =

Software synthesizer by Image-Line

- Sytrus screenshot on Windows
- Developer: Image-Line Software (International)
- Initial release: 29 December 2003; 22 years ago
- Written in: Delphi
- Operating system: Microsoft Windows
- Type: Software synthesizer
- License: Proprietary
- Website: www.image-line.com

Sytrus is a software synthesizer plugin developed by Image-Line. It is part of the digital audio workstation FL Studio. Image-Line has also released VSTi and DXi versions of the plugin.

== Overview ==
=== Features ===
Eclectic Sytrus
Example track created with Sytrus and default FL Studio drums

Sytrus is a software synthesizer plugin bundled with FL Studio, though it can also be purchase separately for use with other digital audio workstations.

Old UI of Sytrus used before version 12.3 of FL Studio

Sytrus uses a combination of subtractive synthesis, additive synthesis, FM synthesis and ring modulation, thus allowing sounds produced to range from drum sets to organs. Sytrus provides a large number of adjustments and controls, including shape shifting, harmonics editing, EQ, a modulator (which can control almost any parameter), several filters, reverb, delay, unison, detune, etc. CPU usage widely varies, mainly depending on effect settings, number of oscillators, and their settings. The second version of Sytrus (introduced with FL Studio 6), comes with an array of presets covering many types of sounds.

=== Easter eggs ===
When clicking on the Sytrus logo in "Show Info", the Hint Bar at the top says "Don't even think about it you fruit-clicking pervert!". After several more clicks, it will say, "Ok, fruit-clicking pays." At this stage, the modulator grid changes to green rather than the standard blue. Then, "There's nothing more, you know..." This easter egg was removed in FL Studio 12 when the plugin was redesigned alongside the rest of the DAW.

== Reception ==
MusicRadar praised Sytrus, calling it an "almost unfeasibly capable synth," though noted the high pricing for the plugin and its complexity. American electronic musician Porter Robinson mentioned Sytrus among his favourite software synthesizers in 2012.

== See also ==
- Harmor
