= FL Studio =

Digital audio workstation

- The program's original logo depicted a strawberry with a worm crawling out of it. The current logo (above) is a stylized orange fruit with green leaves. According to the developers, it is not intended to represent any specific fruit.
- Original author: (Belgium) Didier Dambrin
- Developer: Image-Line Software
- Release: April 26, 1998; 28 years ago (as FruityLoops)
- Stable release: 2026.1.6 / September 7, 2026
- Written in: Delphi, Assembly language
- Operating system: macOS, Windows, Android, iOS
- Available in: English, German, French, Spanish, Chinese, Vietnamese, Japanese, Korean
- Type: Digital audio workstation
- License: Proprietary
- Website: image-line.com

FL Studio (previously known both as FrootyLoops and FruityLoops) is a digital audio workstation (DAW) developed by the Belgian company Image-Line. It features a graphical user interface with a pattern-based music sequencer.

This program is often used as a 'gamified' alternative to less accessible industry-standard DAWs such as Logic or Ableton. It is also seen as more cost-effective, and after the initial purchase, lifetime updates of the software are free to registered users.

It is available in five different editions (including FL Mobile) for Microsoft Windows and macOS. Image-Line also develops FL Studio Mobile for Android, iOS, macOS, and Universal Windows Platform devices.

FL Studio can be used either as an Audio Unit (AU) [macOS only] or a Virtual Studio Technology (VST) instrument in other audio workstation programs, and as a ReWire client. Image-Line offers its own AU and VST instruments and audio applications.

== Overview ==
FL Studio comes in several editions with different levels of functionality. The free trial version includes all of the program's features, all plugins, and allows users to render project audio to WAV, MIDI, MP3, FLAC and OGG. Projects saved while in demo mode, however, can only be opened once FL Studio and its plugins have been registered. Also, instrument presets cannot be saved and the audio output of some instruments is cut out momentarily every few minutes until the program and its plugins have been registered.

== History ==
On December 18, 1997, Image-Line Software partially released the first version of FruityLoops (1.0.0), developed by Didier Dambrin. This was only two years after Belgian programmers Jean-Marie Cannie and Frank Van Biesen left Pavell Software to start their own company in Image-Line. Before developing music software, Image-Line produced adult video games, including Porntris and Private Investigator. Rapper Ice-T reportedly praised Private Investigator at a convention in Las Vegas in 1996, stating that "this game beats cocaine!". Image-Line entered a modified version of one of its games in IBM's 'Da Vinci' programming competition, where the founders met Didier "Gol" Dambrin, who subsequently joined the company. Dambrin, only 19 at the time, agreed to sign with Image-Line and shortly produced the first version of FruityLoops Studio.

In early 1998, Image-Line officially launched FruityLoops with Dambrin as the Chief Software Architect for the program. The program was originally a four-channel MIDI drum machine, with attempts to cater to a different audience than industry-standard DAWs. There was a video-game feel to the program, that drew young, aspiring musicians. Despite having no official musical background, Dambrin was able to combine elements of the sequencing program ReBirth 338 and the Hammerhead rhythm station drum machine in FrootyLoops Original Release.

FruityLoops Studio found overnight popularity, with an explosion of users finding the program on websites like download.com and word of mouth through peer-to-peer networks like Kazaa. This caused early crashes of Image-Line's servers and failed to turn a profit due to rampant piracy in the early days of the internet. Image-Line had to rely on its other revenue-generating business-facing enterprises to pay the bills and support Dambrin's project in FruityLoops Studio. It took nearly 5 years for the company to turn a profit from users purchasing legitimate licenses.

Image-Line later renamed FruityLoops to FL Studio during the release of their fourth version of the software, after the company's attempt to obtain a US trademark prompted concerns from Kellogg's. Dambrin claimed that he thought users might interpret the software title as 'Eiffel' Studio, instead of simply an abbreviation of FruityLoops Studio.

FL Studio began receiving mainstream recognition and success with the release of prominent hip-hop, grime, and EDM that was produced on the software. Hip-hop producer 9th Wonder produced Little Brother's 2003 album The Listening and Jay-Z's "Threat" and The Black Album entirely on FL Studio. This commercial success brought a new flood of young producers to Image-Line's program. Another significant boost to the program's notoriety was Soulja Boy's 2007 #1 hit "Crank That", which was produced using just the stock instruments on the trial version of FL Studio.

FL Studio continued to gain popularity and eventually released a macOS-compatible version in 2018. Dambrin, who had been the sole architect of the program since its inception, left the company in 2015 and was reportedly replaced by no less than 12 programmers. FL Studio continues to be a staple in hip-hop, rage, EDM, and grime production.

== System requirements ==
FL Studio processes audio using an internal 32-bit floating point engine. It supports sampling rates up to 192 kHz using either WDM- or ASIO-enabled drivers.

Audio can be imported or exported as WAV, MP3, OGG, FLAC, MIDI, ZIP, or the native project format with an .FLP filename extension. The trial allows users to save projects, but does not allow reopening them. Tracks may be exported to any of the available file formats.

=== Dedicated hardware ===
As with other DAW developers, Image-Line has collaborated with hardware manufacturers on two occasions, resulting in the release of products branded and compatible with FL Studio.

The first was the Akai Professional FIRE, a MIDI controller with touch and pressure-sensitive buttons modelled after the software's channel rack pattern editor. Released in 2018, it can be used as a pattern editor, keyboard, drumpad, multi-colour peak visualizer and performance controller. A distinctive feature of the Akai FIRE is that up to 4 units can be connected to a single instance of FL Studio, chained together or with a different mode set for each. It is sold in two variants, one coming without extra software (aimed at existing FL Studio users), and one bundled with an exclusive version of the Fruity edition called the Fruity Fire Edition.

The latter of these involvements is currently the Novation FL Key line of controllers. It consists of four redesigned MIDI Keyboards – dubbed the FL Key Mini, FL Key 37, FL Key 49, and the FL Key 61, each varying in keybed and size, alongside having progressively more additional control features on top. The design is originally from Novation's own Launchkey line, modified to have a grey case and an FL Studio-themed RGB lighting palette. They later released the FL Key 61, a larger version with the same features. In May 2026, Novation released a second generation of hardware, the FLkey MK2. Shortly after, in October 2026, a variant of Novation's existing Launchpad controller, the FLpad, was released, with the same modified design philosophy of the FLkey.

Despite some initial traction regarding the Akai FIRE's unusual velocity implementation, both units have gone on to receive broadly positive reception from the professional press.

== Plug-ins ==
FL Studio comes with a variety of plugins and generators (software synthesizers) written in the program's own native plugin architecture, such as Harmor and Sytrus. FL Studio also has support for third-party VST and DirectX plugins. The API has a built in wrapper for full VST, VST2, VST3, DX, and ReWire compatibility. There has also been support for the CLAP plugin format since FL Studio 2024.

Image-Line previously sold some of its FL Studio plugins in VST and AU formats for use in other digital audio workstations, but discontinued sale of them in 2021.

== Reception ==
FL Studio has been praised for its simplicity, power, and ease of use. Jamie Lendino of PCMag wrote that "While [FL Studio is] still clearly geared for electronic music production 'in the box,' as opposed to recording live musicians playing acoustic instruments, you can record or create just about any kind of audio project with it."

Criticisms include an unconventional audio recording system.
