= Comparison of HTML editors =

The following tables compare general and technical information for a number of HTML editors.

Please see the individual products' articles for further information, comparison of text editors for information on text editors, and comparison of word processors or information on word processors, many of which have features to assist with writing HTML.

== General information ==
Systems listed on a light purple background are no longer in active development.

Editor	Developer	Latest release		License
Editor	Developer	Version	Date	License
Amaya	W3C, INRIA	11.4.4	2012-01-18	W3C
Apache OpenOffice	Apache Foundation	4.1.16	2025-11-10	MPL/Apache-2.0/others
Aptana Studio	Aptana	3.7.2	2018-07-30	GPL
Arachnophilia	Paul Lutus	5.5.2953	2020-10-29	GPL-2.0-or-later
Atom	GitHub	1.63.1	2022-11-23	MIT
Bluefish	Bluefish open source community	2.4.1	2026-04-03	GPL-3.0-or-later
BlueGriffon	Disruptive Innovations	3.1	2017-12-04	MPL-2.0
Brackets	Adobe	2.2.1	2023-03-22	MIT
Claris Homepage	Claris	3.0	1998	Proprietary
Coda	Panic, Inc.			Proprietary
Codelobster	Codelobster Software	2.6.0	2024-11-25	Proprietary
CoffeeCup HTML Editor	CoffeeCup Software	17.0.882	2022-04-08	Proprietary
Contribute	Adobe Systems (Note: Formerly Macromedia.)	CS6.5 (8)	2012-08-23	Proprietary
Dreamweaver	Adobe Systems	21.7	2025-12	Proprietary
EZGenerator	Image-Line	4.1	2012-12	Proprietary
Freeway	Softpress	7.1.3	2016-05-05	Proprietary
GoLive	Adobe Systems (Note: Formerly GoLive Systems.)	9.0	2007-06-01	Proprietary
Google Web Designer	Google, Inc.		2018-07	Proprietary
KompoZer	Kaze			MPL-1.1/GPL 2.0/LGPL 2.1
LibreOffice	The Document Foundation	26.2.4	2026-06-05	MPL-2.0/Apache-2.0/others
Maqetta	IBM	10.0.2	2013-07-03	BSD-3-Clause or AFL-2.1
Microsoft Expression Web	Microsoft	4.0.1460.0	2012-12-20	Proprietary
Microsoft Office FrontPage	Microsoft	11.0.8174	2003-10-21	Proprietary
Microsoft FrontPage Express	Microsoft	2.0	1997	Proprietary
Microsoft SharePoint Designer	Microsoft	2007	2006-12-04	Proprietary
Microsoft Visual Studio Code	Microsoft	1.124.2	2026-06-12	MIT
Microsoft Visual Web Developer	Microsoft		2008	Proprietary
Mozilla Composer	Mozilla Foundation			MPL-1.1/GPL 2.0/LGPL 2.1
Nvu	Linspire / Daniel Glazman	1.0	2005-06-28	MPL-1.1/GPL 2.0/LGPL 2.1
OpenOffice.org	Sun Microsystems (1999–2009); Oracle Corporation (2010–2011)	3.3.0	2011-01-17	LGPL-3.0
oXygenXML Editor (Note: Though the focus of this software is clearly XML, it covers so much of the HTML and XHTML features (all of them, basically) as well as generating HTML and XHTML based documents and sites (e.g. WebHelp, ePub, etc.) that leaving it out just appears a bit weird.)	Syncro Soft	28.1	2026-03-18	Proprietary (Note: Some components under Apache-2.0.)
RocketCake	Ambiera	5.1	2023-03-15	Proprietary
SeaMonkey Composer	SeaMonkey Council	2.53.23	2025-12-31	MPL-2.0
TextMate	Macromates	2.0.23	2021-10-12	GPL-3.0-or-later
TOWeb	Lauyan Software	10.06	2022-02-07	Proprietary
WebStorm IDE	JetBrains	2025.2.1	2025-08-29	Proprietary
Editor	Developer	Latest release		License
Editor	Developer	Version	Date	License

== See also ==
- List of HTML editors
- Website builder
- Tableless web design
