= CSS HTML Validator =

HTML editor and CSS editor for Windows

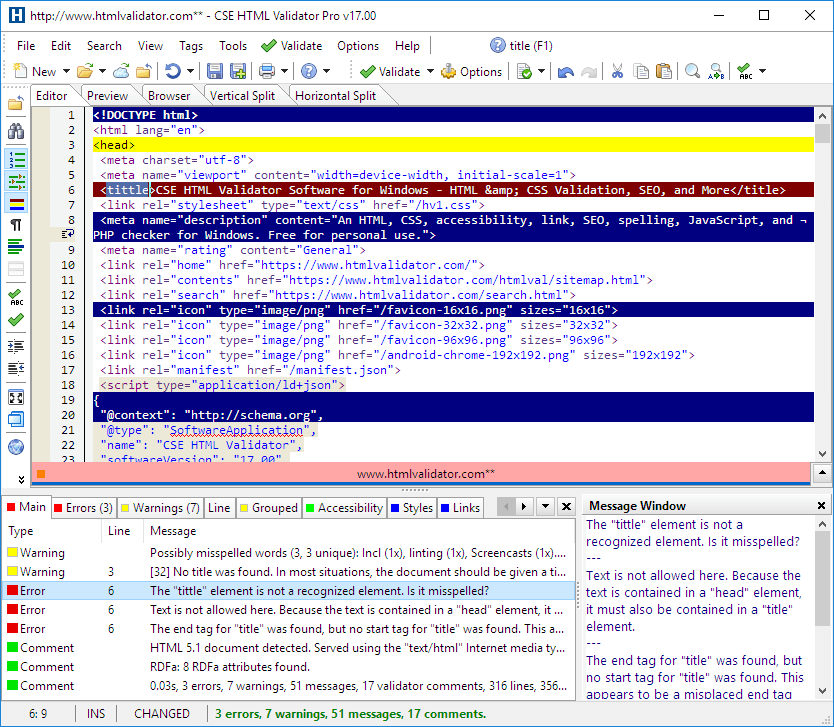
- CSS HTML Validator Pro
- Developer: AI Internet Solutions LLC
- Stable release: 2026 (v26.02) / April 1, 2026; 4 months ago
- Operating system: Windows 10 and Windows 11
- Type: HTML editor
- License: Trialware
- Website: www.htmlvalidator.com

CSS HTML Validator (previously named CSE HTML Validator) is an HTML editor and CSS editor for Microsoft Windows (and macOS, Linux and other Unix-like operating systems when used with Wine or the command-line tool) that helps web developers create syntactically correct and accessible HTML/HTML5, XHTML, and CSS documents by locating errors, potential problems like browser compatibility issues, and common mistakes. It is also able to check links, check spelling, suggest improvements, alert developers to deprecated, obsolete, or proprietary tags, attributes, and CSS properties, and find issues that can affect search engine optimization.

CSS HTML Validator is developed, marketed, and sold by AI Internet Solutions LLC located in the United States. The first version of CSS HTML Validator was released in 1997 for Windows 95. The current non-BETA version is 2026/v26.02 (as of August 6, 2026) and is for Windows 10 and above, including Windows 11. The current BETA version is 2027 (as of August 6, 2026). A native macOS and Linux command-line console tool (called htmlval) became available with version 23. There are currently three main editions of CSS HTML Validator — Pro/Professional, Home/Standard, and Lite. The Enterprise edition was discontinued in 2025/v25.

While the application is generally a commercial product (except for the Lite edition), a free version of the Home edition is available for personal/educational, non-commercial use. A free limited version of the htmlval command-line console tool for macOS and Linux is also available. The online edition is also free to use.

== Features ==
CSS HTML Validator includes an HTML editor, validator for HTML, XHTML, htmx, polyglot markup, CSS, PHP and JavaScript (using JSLint or JSHint), link checker (to find dead and broken links), spell checker, accessibility checker, and search engine optimization (SEO) checker. An integrated web browser allows developers to browse the web while the pages are automatically validated.

Because documents are checked locally and not uploaded over the Internet to a server in order to be checked, validations are performed relatively quickly, and security and privacy are increased.

A custom scripting language called TNPL, included in the Pro and Enterprise editions, can be used to customize validations by adding, eliminating, or changing validator messages. TNPL can also be used to integrate customized validation checks to meet the unique requirements of an individual or entity.

A Batch Wizard tool, included in the Pro and Enterprise editions, can check entire Web sites, parts of Web sites, or a list of local web documents. The Batch Wizard generates reports in standard HTML or XML format. The reports can be viewed using a normal web browser.

The accessibility checker includes support for Section 508 Amendment to the Rehabilitation Act of 1973 and Web Content Accessibility Guidelines (both WCAG 1.0 and WCAG 2.0/2.1/2.2).

Using a version of HTML Tidy with HTML5 support and the Pretty Print & Fix Tool, CSS HTML Validator can automatically fix some common problems with HTML and XHTML documents. However, some problems cannot be fixed (or fixed correctly) with automated tools and require manual review and repair.

== Version history ==
Validation of polyglot markup was added in version 12, and mobile development support (for HTML and CSS) was added in version 14 and improved in version 15. Version 15 added built-in syntax checking for JSON and HTML5 cache manifest files. Version 16 added JavaScript linting using JSHint, a static code analysis tool for checking JavaScript, but also continues to support JSLint. Version 17 added support for the Accelerated Mobile Pages Project, which is a type of HTML optimized for mobile web browsing, and support for live DOM validation using Google Chrome

CSS HTML Validator 2018/v18 renames the software from CSE HTML Validator to CSS HTML Validator and includes updated HTML5 and CSS support. Version 18 also added a new "By Message" report in the Batch Wizard and dropped support for Windows Vista and below.

CSS HTML Validator 2019/v19 includes updated HTML and CSS support, adds WCAG 2.1 support, improves support when running under Wine (software), and is a native 64-bit application (previously releases were 32-bit). CSS HTML Validator 2020/v20, first released in January 2020, includes HTML, CSS, accessibility, and other updates, including improved support for the Accelerated Mobile Pages Project. Also, beginning with version 20, the Standard edition was renamed to the Home edition.

CSS HTML Validator 2021/v21, first released in January 2021, includes further HTML, CSS, accessibility, and other updates.

CSS HTML Validator 2022/v22, released in January 2022, includes improvements and updates to keep the program up-to-date, a new Microsoft Edge WebView2 rendering engine for the integrated web browser, and three new dark themes. Later updates to version 22 added support for checking JSON Lines and NDJSON documents.

CSS HTML Validator 2023/v23, released in January 2023, includes more improvements and updates to keep the program up-to-date. The new release also introduced new command-line macOS and Linux ports of the core validation engine, called htmlval for Mac and Linux. Official support for Windows 7, 8, and 8.1 was dropped in the 2023/v23 version.

CSS HTML Validator 2024/v24, released in January 2024, includes updates and improvements. It also adds support for htmx. CSS HTML Validator 2025/v25, released in December 2024, includes further updates and improvements for 2025. Version 25 discontinues the Enterprise edition, moving Enterprise functionality to the Pro edition.

CSS HTML Validator 2026/v26, released in January 2026, includes updated support for HTML and CSS.

CSS HTML Validator 2027/v26.5, first released in BETA in August 2026, includes updated support for accessibility checking, HTML, and CSS.

An online edition based on CSS HTML Validator Pro that can check documents via file upload, URL, or snippets (direct text input) was discontinued May 2017 in favor of the desktop version for Microsoft Windows. In August 2026, the online edition became available again at a new location, https://htmlval.com .

== Purpose of validation ==
The purpose of validation and computerized checking of HTML, XHTML, and CSS documents is to help make sure that the documents are syntactically correct and problem-free. Checked HTML, XHTML, and CSS documents are more likely to:

- be more accessible for people with disabilities (such as blindness), as well as all users in general
- render faster (user agents don't have to "figure out" and decipher bad syntax)
- render as intended and with fewer problems on a variety of user agents, including mobile devices
- cause browsers and user agents to build a more consistent Document Object Model, which is important for CSS and JavaScript
- be forward-compatible with future versions of user agents and browsers ("future-proof")
- be compatible with current and future HTML, XHTML, and CSS specifications
- cause fewer problems for visitors and web indexing
- not contain dead, broken, or rotting links

While automated checking tools are helpful for website development and continued maintenance, they cannot guarantee that a document will display (render) and behave as intended in all browsers. Developers should always test documents in a variety of browsers (including mobile browsers) to locate problems that cannot be detected with a computerized checking tool.

== Differences from other HTML validators ==
- CSS HTML Validator is an offline desktop app for Microsoft Windows and a native macOS and Linux command-line console tool that does not require an Internet connection. The offline nature of CSS HTML Validator is in contrast to online web-based services.
- CSS HTML Validator primarily works offline (except for link checking when it must go online), which has speed and privacy benefits compared to web-based solutions and services like the W3C Markup Validation Service. However, the user must keep the software updated unlike web-based solutions which are typically kept updated by the solution provider.
- CSS HTML Validator checks HTML/XHTML syntax, CSS, links, spelling, accessibility, JavaScript, SEO, and PHP with one pass, while DTD-based validators are more limited and cannot check HTML5.
- CSS HTML Validator includes a built-in scripting language (called TNPL) which allows for a high degree of customization via scripting and "user functions". This allows developers to add custom (specialized) validation checks and messages.
- CSS HTML Validator includes a DTD-based validator which can optionally be used for checking DTD-based versions of HTML (versions prior to HTML5), however one of CSS HTML Validator's primary differences is that its custom validation engine can perform more checks on a document than a DTD-based validator can. This is because DTD-based validators are limited to checking only what can be specified in a Document Type Definition.

== Integration ==
CSS HTML Validator integrates with other third-party software like those listed below. This allows validation using CSS HTML Validator from within the third-party program.

- EmEditor - includes a special Lite edition build of CSS HTML Validator for built-in checking of HTML and CSS
- Blumentals Software - several Blumentals software products integrate with CSS HTML Validator
- HTML-Kit
- HomeSite
- Microsys A1 Website Analyzer
- TextPad
