= Mozilla Composer =

HTML editor and web authoring module of the Mozilla Application Suite

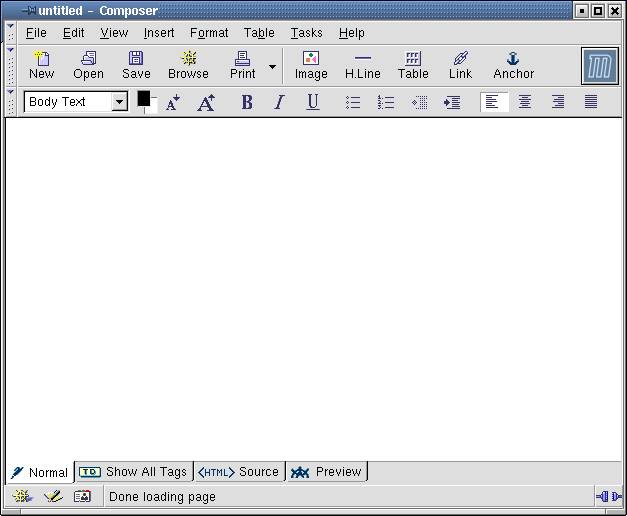
- Mozilla Composer running on Linux
- Developer: Mozilla
- Operating system: Windows, macOS, Linux
- Type: HTML editor
- License: MPL, GPL, LGPL
- Website: www-archive.mozilla.org/editor/

Mozilla Composer is the former free and open-source HTML editor and web authoring module of the Mozilla Application Suite (the predecessor to SeaMonkey). It was used to create and to edit web pages, e-mail, and text documents, and available for Windows, macOS and Linux. Composer was a graphical WYSIWYG HTML editor to view, write and edit HTML source code.

In September 2008 Daniel Glazman announced a new WYSIWYG HTML editor, BlueGriffon, written from scratch and based on Mozilla Gecko and XULRunner.

SeaMonkey, the community-driven successor to Mozilla Suite, includes an HTML editor named Composer that is developed from the Mozilla Composer code contained in the original Mozilla Suite.

== Nvu ==
Nvu
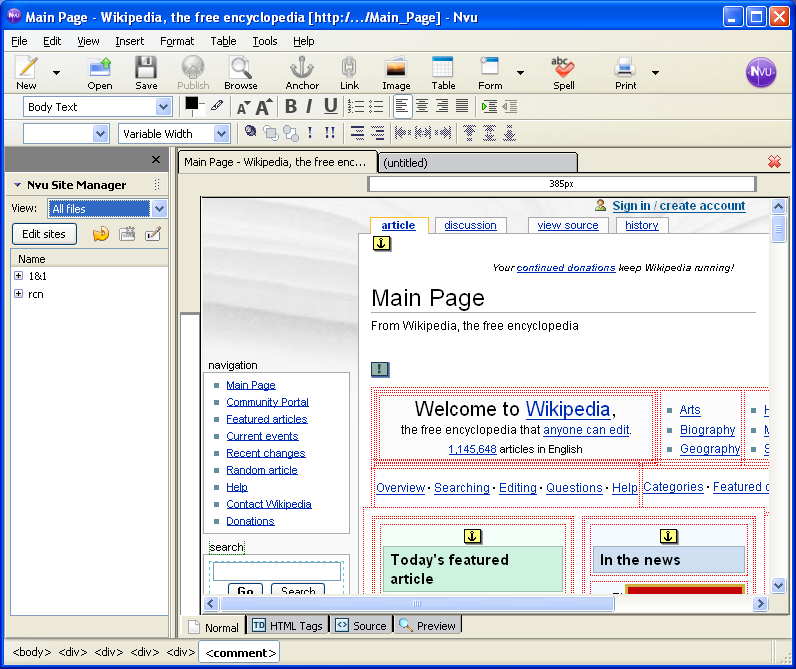
- Nvu 1.0 editing Wikipedia main page
- Developers: Linspire, Daniel Glazman
- Final release: 1.0 / 28 June 2005
- Preview release: 1.0PR / 5 April 2005
- Platform: Cross-platform
- Type: HTML editor
- License: MPL, GPL, LGPL
- Website: www.nvu.com

Nvu (pronounced "N-view") was a WYSIWYG HTML editor, based on Mozilla Composer. It is intended to be an open-source alternative to proprietary software like Microsoft Expression Web and Adobe Dreamweaver. As a WYSIWYG editor, it is designed to be easy for novice users, and does not require any knowledge of HTML or CSS to use. It runs on Mac OS X, Windows and Linux and incorporates Cascading Style Sheets support and other improvements from software company Disruptive Innovations. Nvu was the brainchild of Kevin Carmony, CEO for Linspire, who wanted an easy-to-use, WYSIWYG HTML editor for Linux users. Under Carmony's direction, Linspire started and sponsored Nvu, hiring Daniel Glazman, former Netscape Communications Corporation employee, to be the lead developer.

=== Development ===
The original plan in June 2005 was to merge back the numerous changes into Mozilla Composer's source code tree. Since then the Mozilla Suite has been discontinued (then reintroduced as SeaMonkey), and no one has merged the Nvu code back into Composer.

=== Standards compliance ===
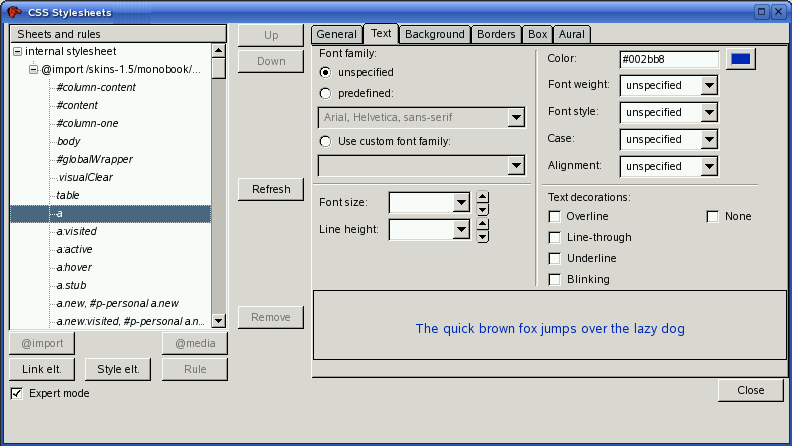
Nvu CSS editor

Nvu complies with the W3C's web standards. By default, pages are created in accordance to HTML 4.01 Transitional and use CSS for styling, but the user can change the settings and choose between:

- Strict and transitional DTD's
- HTML 4.01 and XHTML 1.0
- CSS styling or the old <font> based styling.

The application includes a built-in HTML validator, which uploads pages to the W3C's HTML Validator and checks for compliance.

=== Release history ===
- 0.1 was released on February 4, 2004
- 0.20 was released on March 25, 2004
- 0.3 was released on June 11, 2004
- 0.4 was released on August 10, 2004
- 0.5 was released on October 6, 2004
- 0.6 (1.0b) was pre-released on November 26, 2004
- 0.7 (1.0b2) was pre-released on January 6, 2005
- 0.8 (1.0b3) was pre-released on February 2, 2005
- 0.81 was pre-released on February 9, 2005
- 0.90RC1 was released on March 4, 2005
- 0.90 was released on March 11, 2005
- 1.0PR was released on April 5, 2005
- 1.0 was released on June 28, 2005

=== Shift to KompoZer ===
Daniel Glazman, the lead developer of Nvu, announced on September 15, 2006, that he had stopped official development on Nvu and that he was developing a successor as a Mozilla.org project. It is written from scratch and based on Mozilla trunk Gecko 1.9 and XULRunner. PHP and CSS would be supported. A community-driven fork, KompoZer, maintains Nvu codebase and fixes bugs until a successor to Nvu is released. Glazman's project is called BlueGriffon.

== KompoZer ==
KompoZer

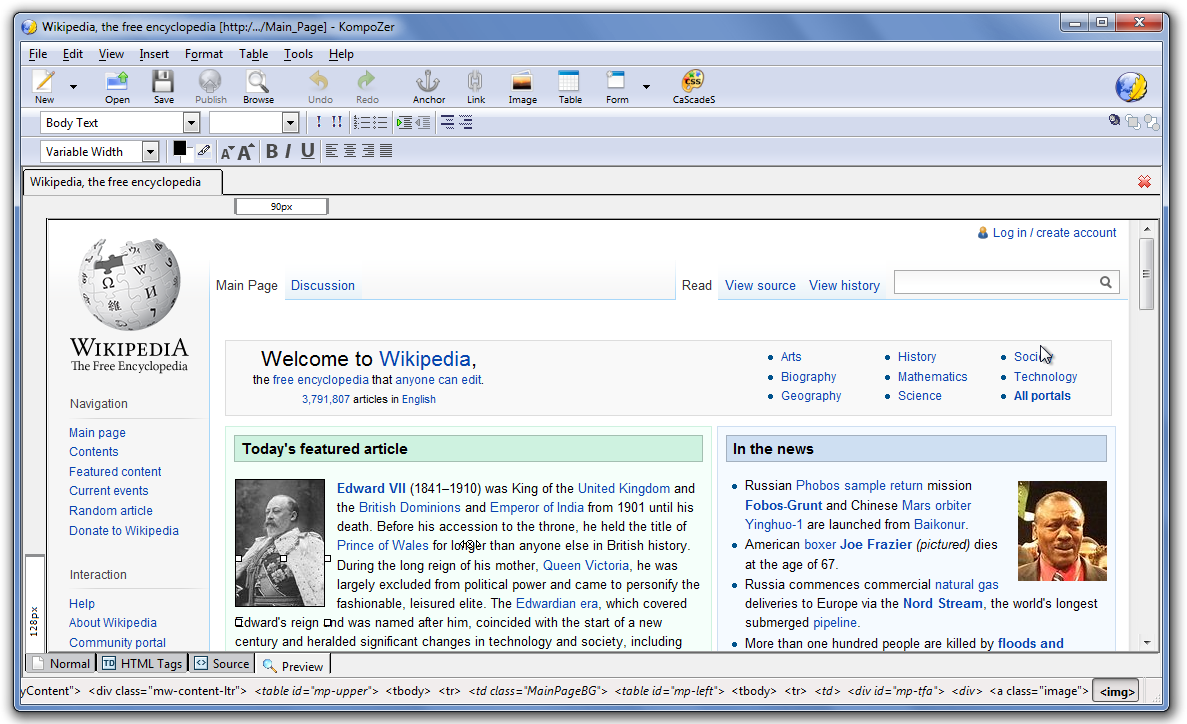
- KompoZer 0.7.10 editing Wikipedia main page
- Original author: Fabien Cazenave
- Platform: Cross-platform
- Type: HTML editor
- License: MPL/GPL/LGPL tri-license
- Website: kompozer.net

KompoZer is a discontinued open source WYSIWYG HTML editor based on Nvu. KompoZer was forked as a community-driven project with development coordinated through SourceForge.

KompoZer's WYSIWYG editing capabilities are one of the main attractions of the software. In addition, KompoZer allows direct code editing as well as a split code-graphic view.

The most recent version is KompoZer 0.8 beta 3, released February 2010, using Gecko 1.8.1. The stable version was 0.7.10, released in August 2007. The only regular developer said in June 2011 that development "is stalled at the moment".

As a 32-bit application, it is no longer supported on macOS Catalina and later versions.

=== Standards compliance ===
KompoZer complies with the W3C's web standards. By default, pages are created in accordance to HTML 4.01 Strict and use Cascading Style Sheets (CSS) for styling, but the user can change the settings and choose between:

- Strict and transitional DTD's
- HTML 4.01 and XHTML 1.0
- CSS styling or the old <font> based styling.

The application can call on the W3C HTML validator, which uploads pages to the W3C Markup Validation Service and checks for compliance.

== See also ==
- Comparison of HTML editors
- ActiveState Komodo
- BlueGriffon (replaces Nvu)
- SeaMonkey (includes the Gecko-based HTML editor that KompoZer derived from)
- List of HTML editors
