= BlueGriffon =

Web and EPUB Editor based on the rendering engine of Firefox

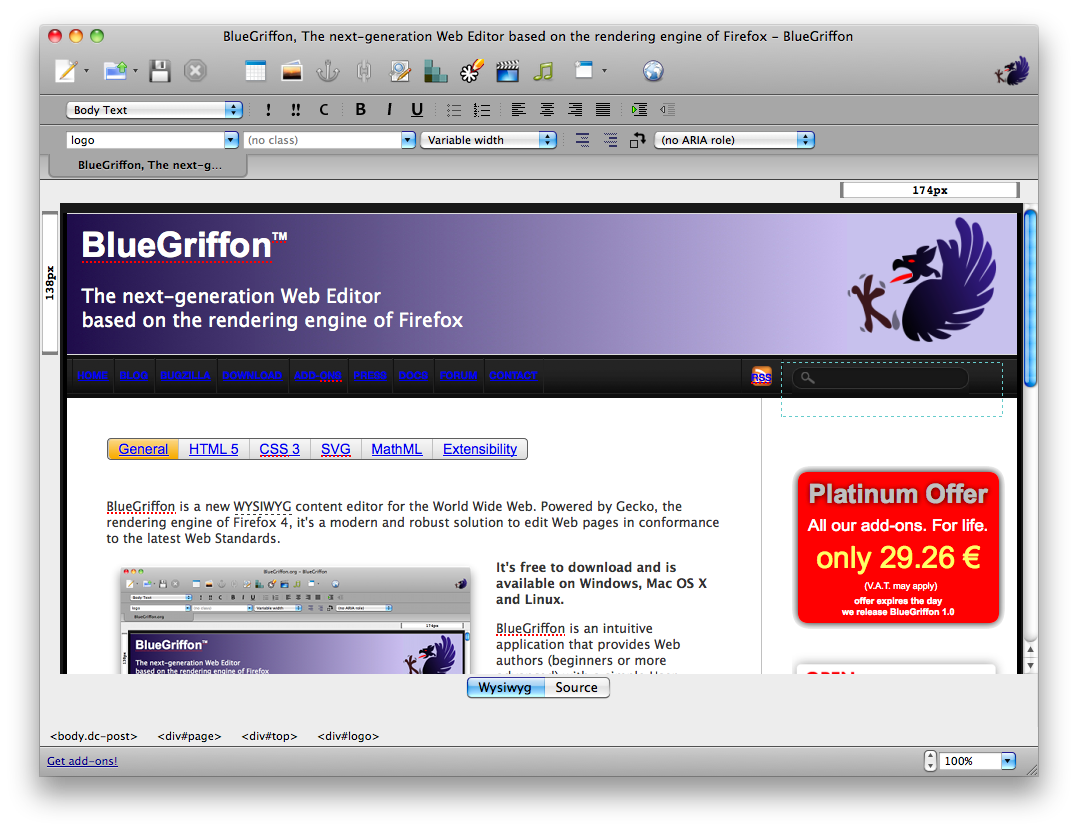
- Developer: Daniel Glazman
- Final release: 3.1 / 4 December 2017
- Written in: C/C++, JavaScript, CSS, XUL, XBL
- Operating system: Microsoft Windows macOS; Linux
- Platform: Cross-platform
- Available in: 20 languages
- List of languages English (USA), Czech, German, Spanish (Castellano), Finnish, French (France), Galician, Hebrew, Italian, Japanese, Korean, Dutch, Polish, Russian, Slovene, Swedish, Chinese (Simplified), Chinese (Traditional), Hungarian, Serbian.
- Type: HTML editor
- License: MPL-2.0; Proprietary license for most add-ons
- Website: bluegriffon.org
- Repository: github.com/therealglazou/bluegriffon

BlueGriffon is a WYSIWYG content editor for the World Wide Web. It is based on the discontinued Nvu editor, which in turn is based on the Composer component of the Mozilla Application Suite, which was previously known as Netscape Composer, which was bundled with Netscape Gold before it was renamed to Netscape Communicator. Powered by Gecko, the rendering engine of Firefox, it can edit Web pages in conformance to Web Standards. It ran on Microsoft Windows, macOS and Linux.

BlueGriffon complies with the W3C's web standards. It can create and edit pages in accordance to HTML 4, XHTML 1.1, HTML 5 and XHTML 5. It supports CSS 2.1 and all parts of CSS 3 already implemented by Gecko. BlueGriffon also includes SVG-edit, an XUL-based editor for SVG that is originally distributed as an add-on to Firefox and was adapted to BlueGriffon.

The last proprietary release of BlueGriffon 3.1 can be found on the Internet Archive, available for Windows, macOS and Linux, as well as two enhancements via add-ons: 'FireFTP' and 'Dictionaries' in 13 languages.

In March 2024, BlueGriffon was discontinued, announced by a signed message on the project's website. There, Daniel Glazman explains the decision was made in part after changes to third party technologies BlueGriffon relied on, the effort and time required to transition BlueGriffon to a web application, as well as a personal need to move on. Following the announcement, the source code of BlueGriffon was released to the public on GitHub, under the MPL-2.0 license, where it remains available.

== Awards ==
Disruptive Innovations was one of five Innovation award winners for its BlueGriffon project during the Demo Cup organized as part of the 2010 Open World Forum held in Paris in October 2010.

In 2013, Disruptive Innovations received the META Seal of Recognition from the Multilingual Europe Technology Alliance for being the first editor to implement the three main data categories of the W3C Internationalization Tag Set 2.0

== See also ==
- Comparison of HTML editors
- KompoZer, also based on Nvu
- Maqetta
