= ESLint =

JavaScript code analysis software

- Original author: Nicholas C. Zakas
- Developer: Nicholas C. Zakas
- Release: June 30, 2013; 13 years ago
- Stable release: 10.14.0 / 30 October 2026; 8 days ago
- Written in: JavaScript
- Operating system: Cross-platform
- Available in: English
- Type: Static code analysis
- License: MIT License
- Website: eslint.org
- Repository: github.com/eslint/eslint

ESLint is a static code analysis tool for identifying problematic patterns found in JavaScript code. It was created by Nicholas C. Zakas in 2013. Rules in ESLint are configurable, and customized rules can be defined and loaded. ESLint covers both code quality and coding style issues. ESLint supports current standards of ECMAScript, and experimental syntax from drafts for future standards. Code using JSX or TypeScript can also be processed when a plugin or transpiler is used.

== History ==
Both JSLint and JSHint were lacking the ability to create additional rules for code quality and coding style. After contributing to JSHint, Zakas decided to create a new linting tool in June 2013, ESLint (originally called JSCheck, but renamed a month later), where all rules are configurable, and additional rules can be defined or loaded at run-time.

In April 2016, the ESLint project joined the jQuery Foundation. Later that year, jQuery Foundation merged with Dojo Foundation to become JS Foundation as a Linux Foundation project.

In October 2017, the ESLint project became a "Graduate Project" of the JS Foundation through its mentorship program.

As of March 2019, ESLint is part of the OpenJS Foundation, following a merge between the JS Foundation and Node.js Foundation.

== Adoption ==
JetBrains provides integrated support for ESLint in their WebStorm code editor, which runs the ESLint software as configured for the current text file, and displays any warnings near the offending lines of code in the editor.

Since 2016, the Vue.js project provides an ESLint plugin to automatically validate use of Vue.js templates and other features. Since 2018, this plugin is also promoted in the wizard for creating new Vue.js projects.

In October 2018, the React project (developed by Facebook) published an official ESLint plugin to help enforce their coding rules.

As of 2025, ESLint is the most commonly used JavaScript linter and is being downloaded over 43,000,000 times per week.
