= Validator (disambiguation) =

Validator may refer to:

- Validator, a computer program used to check the validity or syntactical correctness of a fragment of code or document.
- Validator (blockchain), an entity involved in committing the blocks into a proof-of-stake blockchain.
- Validator (comics), a team member in Omega Flight comics.
