= NVU (disambiguation) =

NVU or Nvu may refer to:

== Science and technology ==
- Nvu, a WYSIWYG HTML editor
- Neurovascular unit, components of the brain that collectively regulate cerebral blood flow

== Organizations ==
=== Education ===
- Nile Valley University, a public university located in Khartoum, Sudan
- Northern Vermont University, a public university in Johnson and Lyndon, Vermont

=== Other organizations ===
- Nederlandse Volks-Unie, the Dutch political party
- NVU, the nickname of the Northern Virginia United FC, an American soccer club
