= Freeway (software) =

Web design application

- Freeway 5 icon
- Designing a website with Freeway 7.
- Developer: Softpress Systems
- Stable release: 7.1.3 / May 5, 2016
- Operating system: Mac OS X 10.6.8 or higher, Intel 32-bits only, compatible up to Mojave
- Successor: Xway
- Type: Internet publishing
- License: Proprietary
- Website: www.softpress.com

Freeway (originally UniQorn) is a WYSIWYG web design application for Mac OS X developed by the British company Softpress Systems.

== UniQorn ==
Freeway is based on a pre-Mac OS X desktop publishing application called UniQorn, designed to rely on the new QuickDraw GX, and developed by Softpress in 1995. It was designed to copy QuarkXPress. UniQorn 1.1 added support for exporting its documents to the web by producing a Java applet, and version 1.2 made QuickDraw GX optional.

It was discontinued when Apple stopped supporting QuickDraw GX in Mac OS 8, and replaced by Freeway.

== Freeway ==
The idea behind Freeway is to offer a tool to design websites using an interface very similar to that of Desktop publishing applications like QuarkXPress or Adobe InDesign, without the need to dig into the HTML and JavaScript code. More advanced website features, like connecting to a database, are managed through plug-ins called "Actions". Many commonly used Actions are bundled with Freeway itself, like a suite of Actions that lets the user create a shopping cart through the Mals e-commerce system.

Freeway produces syntactically valid HTML code and Cascading Style Sheets, making it usable in situations where valid HTML code is obligatory. Versions of Freeway from 4.3 onwards also create HTML and CSS that correct many rendering problems with Internet Explorer 6 on Windows.

=== Freeway Express ===
Freeway Express appeared around the same time as version 3.5. It is a more entry level version of Freeway aimed at home users and priced accordingly compared to the Pro version. Version 6 for Freeway Expres became the freeware version of Freeway Pro.

=== Reception ===
While presenting favourably to QuarkXPress users with a familiar user experience, Freeway HTML capabilities were often compared to GoLive CyberStudio or Dreamweaver, outlining the latter had better HTML editing.

- Freeway 1.0 got 2 1/2 mice (out of 5) from Macworld in February 1998, praising the ease of use despite the limited HTML capabilities, and the missing features that the competition offers.

- Freeway 2.0 got 3 1/2 mice (out of 5) from Macworld in May 1999, citing the familiarity of use for QuarkXPress users and the good support for CSS and JavaScript, while outlining the lack of access to the HTML output. MacAddict in July 1999 additionally found its retail price too high.

- Freeway 3.0 got 3 mice (out of 5) from Macworld in September 2000, outlining the improvements, but still citing the lack in HTML import, the lack of external style sheet, and the non-validating generated HTML markup. For Freeway 3.5.5, MacAddict gave a 3 (out of 5) solid rating in February 2003.

- Freeway 4 Pro got 4 1/2 (out of 5) rating from Macworld in February 2006, praising the "no HTML experience required" approach while noting the difficulty for an experienced web designer to adjust to it.

- Freeway 5 Pro got 4 (out of 5) with a great rating from MacLife in September 2008, praising its ease of use, standard compliant code and excellent documentation while being limited with HTML hand coding.

== Discontinuation ==
On July 4, 2016, Softpress announced the end of development on Freeway and other software products via a post on the homepage stating, "The end of Softpress Systems Ltd. has come. It has become clear that our prospects, both in terms of current revenue and new product development, are insufficient to sustain the company as a viable entity going forward."

At the start of 2017 the author of Freeway announced the resumption of Softpress' business without dedicated staff technical support. It currently offers five products: Freeway, Freeway Express, Chroma (for selecting color palettes), Exhibio (photo gallery creation), and Fretspace (for creating chord diagrams).

Freeway no longer runs on macOS Catalina or later as Apple deprecated support for its 32-bits API. It is being replaced by Xway.
