= Web design =

Creation and maintenance of websites

Web design encompasses many different skills and disciplines in the production and maintenance of websites. The different areas of web design include web graphic design; user interface design (UI design); authoring, including standardised code and proprietary software; user experience design (UX design); and search engine optimization. Often, many individuals will work in teams covering different aspects of the design process, although some designers will cover them all. The term "web design" is normally used to describe the design process relating to the front-end (client side) design of a website including writing markup. Web design partially overlaps web engineering in the broader scope of web development. Web designers are expected to have an awareness of usability and be up to date with web accessibility guidelines.

== History ==
=== 1988–2001 ===
Although web design has a fairly recent history, it can be linked to other areas such as graphic design, user experience, and multimedia arts, but is more aptly seen from a technological standpoint. It has become a large part of people's everyday lives. It is hard to imagine the Internet without animated graphics, different styles of typography, backgrounds, videos, and music. The World Wide Web was announced on August 6, 1991; in November 1992, CERN was the first website to go live on the World Wide Web. During this period, websites were structured by using the <table> tag, which created numbers on the website. Eventually, web designers were able to find their way around it to create more structures and formats. In the early history of the web, the structure of the websites was fragile and hard to manage, so it became very difficult to use them. In November 1993, ALIWEB was the first ever search engine to be created.

==== The start of the web and web design ====
In 1989, whilst working at CERN in Switzerland, British scientist Tim Berners-Lee proposed to create a global hypertext project, which later became known as the World Wide Web. From 1991 to 1993, the World Wide Web was born. Text-only HTML pages could be viewed using a simple line-mode web browser. In 1993 Marc Andreessen and Eric Bina, created the Mosaic browser. At the time, there were multiple browsers; however, the majority of them were Unix-based and naturally text-heavy. There had been no integrated approach to graphic design elements such as images or sounds. The Mosaic browser broke this mould. The W3C was created in October 1994 to "lead the World Wide Web to its full potential by developing common protocols that promote its evolution and ensure its interoperability." This discouraged any one company from monopolising a proprietary browser and programming language, which could have altered the effect of the World Wide Web as a whole. The W3C continues to set standards, which can today be seen with JavaScript and other languages. In 1994, Andreessen formed Mosaic Communications Corporation, which later became known as Netscape Communications, the Netscape 0.9 browser. Netscape created its HTML tags without regard to the traditional standards process. For example, Netscape 1.1 included tags for changing background colours and formatting text with tables on web pages. From 1996 to 1999, the browser wars began, as Microsoft and Netscape fought for ultimate browser dominance. During this time, there were many new technologies in the field, notably Cascading Style Sheets, JavaScript, and Dynamic HTML. On the whole, the browser competition led to many positive creations and helped web design evolve at a rapid pace.

==== Evolution of web design ====
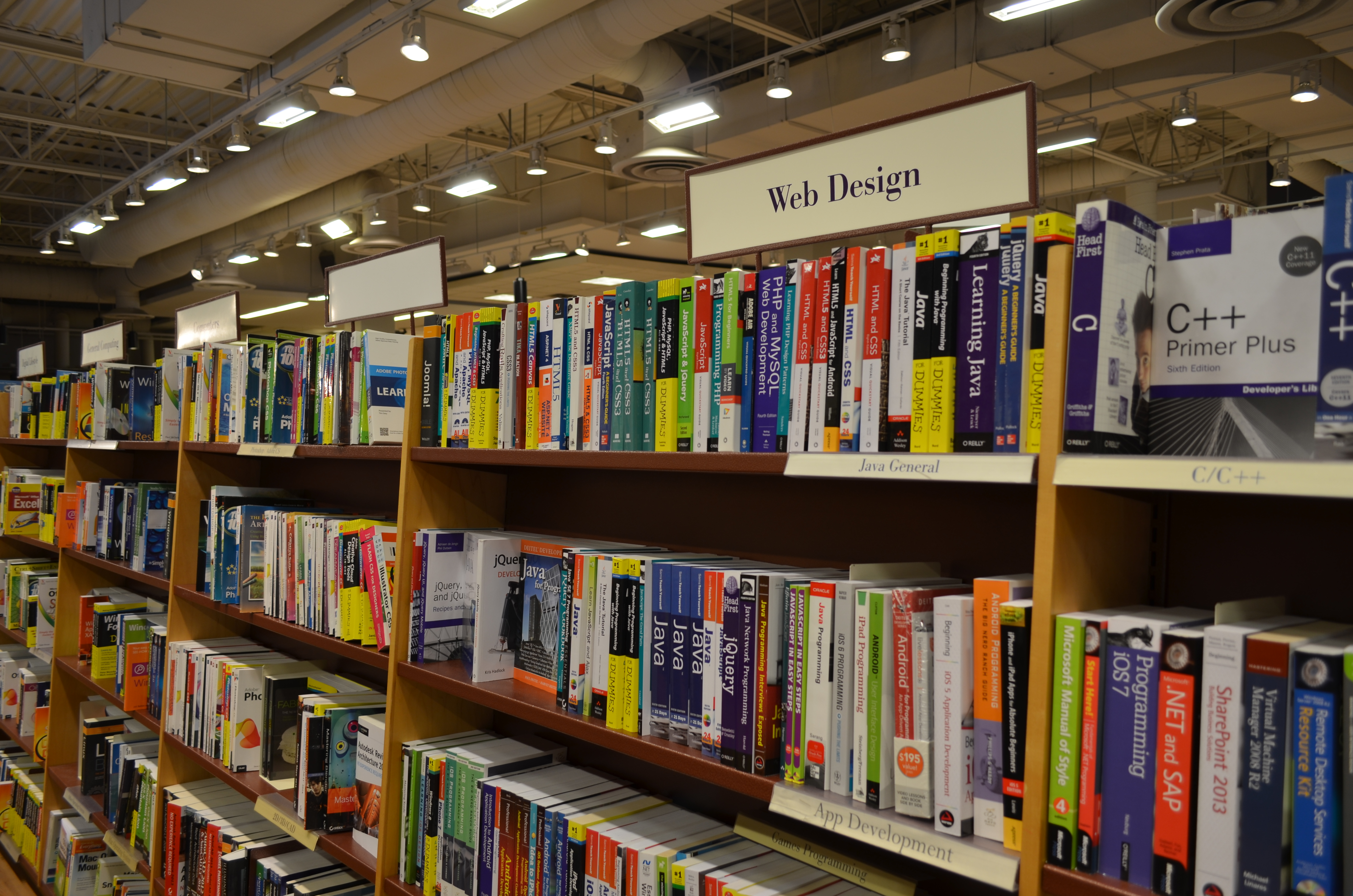
Web design books in a store

In 1996, Microsoft released its first competitive browser, which was complete with its features and HTML tags. It was also the first browser to support style sheets, which at the time was seen as an obscure authoring technique and is today an important aspect of web design. The HTML markup for tables was originally intended for displaying tabular data. However, designers quickly realised the potential of using HTML tables for creating complex, multi-column layouts that were otherwise not possible. At this time, as design and good aesthetics seemed to take precedence over good markup structure, little attention was paid to semantics and web accessibility. HTML sites were limited in their design options, even more so with earlier versions of HTML. To create complex designs, many web designers had to use complicated table structures or even use blank spacer .GIF images to stop empty table cells from collapsing. CSS was introduced in December 1996 by the W3C to support presentation and layout. This allowed HTML code to be semantic rather than both semantic and presentational, and improved web accessibility; see tableless web design.

In 1996, Flash (originally known as FutureSplash) was developed. At the time, the Flash content development tool was relatively simple compared to now, using basic layout and drawing tools, a limited precursor to ActionScript, and a timeline, but it enabled web designers to go beyond the point of HTML, animated GIFs and JavaScript. However, because Flash required a plug-in, many web developers avoided using it for fear of limiting their market share due to a lack of compatibility. Instead, designers reverted to GIF animations (if they did not forego using motion graphics altogether) and JavaScript for widgets. But the benefits of Flash made it popular enough among specific target markets to eventually work its way to the vast majority of browsers, and powerful enough to be used to develop entire sites.

==== End of the first browser wars ====
In 1998, Netscape released the Netscape Communicator source code under an open-source licence, enabling thousands of developers to participate in improving the software. However, these developers decided to start a standard for the web from scratch, which guided the development of the open-source browser and soon expanded to a complete application platform. The Web Standards Project was formed and promoted browser compliance with HTML and CSS standards. Programs like Acid1, Acid2, and Acid3 were created in order to test browsers for compliance with web standards. In 2000, Internet Explorer was released for Mac, which was the first browser that fully supported HTML 4.01 and CSS 1. It was also the first browser to fully support the PNG image format. By 2001, after a campaign by Microsoft, Internet Explorer had reached 96% of web browser usage share and had no significant competition, signifying the end of the first browser wars.

=== 2001–2012 ===
Since the start of the 21st century, the web has become increasingly integrated into people's lives. As this has happened, the technology of the web has also continued to evolve. There have also been significant changes in the way people use and access the web, and this has changed how sites are designed.

Since the end of the browsers wars new browsers have been released. Many of these are open source, meaning that they tend to have faster development and are more supportive of new standards. The new options are considered by many to be better than Microsoft's Internet Explorer.

The W3C has released new standards for HTML (HTML5) and CSS (CSS3), as well as new JavaScript APIs, each as a new but individual standard. While the term HTML5 is only used to refer to the new version of HTML and some of the JavaScript APIs, it has become common to use it to refer to the entire suite of new standards (HTML5, CSS3 and JavaScript).

=== 2012 and later ===
With the advancements in 3G and LTE internet coverage, a significant portion of website traffic shifted to mobile devices. This shift influenced the web design industry, steering it towards a lighter, minimalist style. The "mobile first" approach emerged as a result, emphasizing the creation of website designs that prioritize mobile-oriented layouts before adapting them to larger screen dimensions.

== Tools and technologies ==
Web designers use a variety of different tools depending on what part of the production process they are involved in. These tools are updated over time due to new standards and software changes, but the principles behind them remain the same. Web designers use both vector and raster graphics editors to create web-formatted imagery or design prototypes. A website can be created using WYSIWYG website builder software or a content management system, or the individual web pages can be hand-coded in just the same manner as the first web pages were created. Other tools web designers might use include markup validators and other testing tools for usability and accessibility to ensure their websites meet web accessibility guidelines.

=== UX Design ===
One popular tool in web design is UX Design. A popular modality of modern web design art, it features a user-friendly interface and appropriate presentation.

== Skills and techniques ==
=== Marketing and communication design ===
Marketing and communication design on a website may identify what works for its target market. This can be an age group or particular strand of culture; thus the designer may understand the trends of its audience. Designers may also understand the type of website they are designing, meaning, for example, that business-to-business (B2B) website design considerations might differ greatly from a consumer-targeted website such as a retail or entertainment website. Careful consideration might be made to ensure that the aesthetics or overall design of a site do not clash with the clarity and accuracy of the content or the ease of web navigation, especially on a B2B website. Designers may also consider the reputation of the owner or business the site is representing to make sure they are portrayed favorably. Web designers normally oversee the development of sites with respect to their functioning, often initiating changes as business needs require. They may change elements including text, photos, graphics, and layout. Before beginning work on a website, web designers normally set an appointment with their clients to discuss layout, colour, graphics, and design. Web designers spend the majority of their time designing sites and ensuring their satisfactory performance. They typically engage in testing and communication with other designers about marketing issues and the layout and composition of websites.

=== User experience design and interactive design ===
User understanding of the content of a website often depends on user understanding of how the website works. This is part of the user experience design. User experience is related to layout, clear instructions, and labeling on a website. How well a user understands how they can interact on a site may also depend on the interactive design of the site. If a user perceives the usefulness of the website, they are more likely to continue using it. Users who are skilled and well versed in website use may find a more distinctive, yet less intuitive or less user-friendly website interface useful nonetheless. However, users with less experience are less likely to see the advantages or usefulness of a less intuitive website interface. This drives the trend for a more universal user experience and ease of access to accommodate as many users as possible regardless of user skill. Much of the user experience design and interactive design are considered in the user interface design.

Advanced interactive functions may require plug-ins if not advanced coding language skills. Choosing whether or not to use interactivity that requires plug-ins is a critical decision in user experience design. If the plug-in doesn't come pre-installed with most browsers, there's a risk that the user will have neither the know-how nor the patience to install a plug-in just to access the content. If the function requires advanced coding language skills, it may be too costly in either time or money to code compared to the amount of enhancement the function will add to the user experience. There's also a risk that advanced interactivity may be incompatible with older browsers or hardware configurations. Publishing a function that doesn't work reliably is potentially worse for the user experience than making no attempt. It depends on the target audience if it's likely to be needed or worth any risks.

=== Progressive enhancement ===
The order of progressive enhancement

Progressive enhancement is a strategy in web design that puts emphasis on web content first, allowing everyone to access the basic content and functionality of a web page, whilst users with additional browser features or faster Internet access receive the enhanced version instead.

In practice, this means serving content through HTML and applying styling and animation through CSS to the technically possible extent, then applying further enhancements through JavaScript. Pages' text is loaded immediately through the HTML source code rather than having to wait for JavaScript to initiate and load the content subsequently, which allows content to be readable with minimum loading time and bandwidth, and through text-based browsers, and maximizes backwards compatibility.

As an example, MediaWiki-based sites including Wikipedia use progressive enhancement, as they remain usable while JavaScript and even CSS is deactivated, as pages' content is included in the page's HTML source code, whereas counter-example Everipedia relies on JavaScript to load pages' content subsequently; a blank page appears with JavaScript deactivated.

=== Page layout ===
Part of the user interface design is affected by the quality of the page layout. For example, a designer may consider whether the site's page layout should remain consistent on different pages when designing the layout. Page pixel width may also be considered vital for aligning objects in the layout design. The most popular fixed-width websites generally have the same set width to match the current most popular browser window, at the current most popular screen resolution, on the current most popular monitor size. Most pages are also center-aligned for concerns of aesthetics on larger screens.

Fluid layouts increased in popularity around 2000 to allow the browser to make user-specific layout adjustments to fluid layouts based on the details of the reader's screen (window size, font size relative to window, etc.). They grew as an alternative to HTML-table-based layouts and grid-based design in both page layout design principles and in coding technique but were very slow to be adopted. (Note: <table>-based markup and spacer .GIF images) This was due to considerations of screen reading devices and varying window sizes which designers have no control over. Accordingly, a design may be broken down into units (sidebars, content blocks, embedded advertising areas, navigation areas) that are sent to the browser and which will be fitted into the display window by the browser, as best it can. Although such a display may often change the relative position of major content units, sidebars may be displaced below body text rather than to the side of it. This is a more flexible display than a hard-coded grid-based layout that doesn't fit the device window. In particular, the relative position of content blocks may change while leaving the content within the block unaffected. This also minimizes the user's need to horizontally scroll the page.

Responsive web design is a newer approach, based on CSS3, and a deeper level of per-device specification within the page's style sheet through an enhanced use of the CSS @media rule. In March 2018 Google announced they would be rolling out mobile-first indexing. Sites using responsive design are well placed to ensure they meet this new approach.

=== Typography ===
Web designers may choose to limit the variety of website typefaces to only a few which are of a similar style, instead of using a wide range of typefaces or type styles. Most browsers recognize a specific number of safe fonts, which designers mainly use in order to avoid complications.

Font downloading was later included in the CSS3 fonts module and has since been implemented in Safari 3.1, Opera 10, and Mozilla Firefox 3.5. This has subsequently increased interest in web typography, as well as the usage of font downloading.

Most site layouts incorporate negative space to break the text up into paragraphs and also avoid center-aligned text.

=== Motion graphics ===
The page layout and user interface may also be affected by the use of motion graphics. The choice of whether or not to use motion graphics may depend on the target market for the website. Motion graphics may be expected or at least better received with an entertainment-oriented website. However, a website target audience with a more serious or formal interest (such as business, community, or government) might find animations unnecessary and distracting if only for entertainment or decoration purposes. This doesn't mean that more serious content couldn't be enhanced with animated or video presentations that is relevant to the content. In either case, motion graphic design may make the difference between more effective visuals or distracting visuals.

Motion graphics that are not initiated by the site visitor can produce accessibility issues. The World Wide Web consortium accessibility standards require that site visitors be able to disable the animations.

=== Quality of code ===
Website designers may consider it to be good practice to conform to standards. This is usually done via a description specifying what the element is doing. Failure to conform to standards may not make a website unusable or error-prone, but standards can relate to the correct layout of pages for readability as well as making sure tags are closed appropriately. This includes errors in code, a more organized layout for code, and making sure IDs and classes are identified properly. Poorly coded pages are sometimes colloquially called tag soup. Validating via W3C can only be done when a correct doctype declaration is made, which is used to highlight errors in code. The system identifies the errors and areas that do not conform to web design standards. This information can then be corrected by the user.

=== Generated content ===
There are two ways websites are generated: statically or dynamically.

==== Static websites ====
A static website stores a unique file for every one of its pages. Each time a page is requested, the same content is returned. This content is created once, during the design of the website. It is usually manually authored, although some sites use an automated creation process, similar to a dynamic website, whose results are stored long-term as completed pages. These automatically created static sites became more popular around 2015, with generators such as Jekyll and Adobe Muse.

The benefits of a static website are that they were simpler to host, as their server only needed to serve static content, not execute server-side scripts. This required less server administration and had less chance of exposing security holes. They could also serve pages more quickly, on low-cost server hardware. This advantage became less important as cheap web hosting expanded to also offer dynamic features, and virtual servers offered high performance for short intervals at low cost.

Almost all websites have some static content, as supporting assets such as images and style sheets are usually static, even on a website with highly dynamic pages.

==== Dynamic websites ====
Dynamic websites are generated on the fly and use server-side technology to generate web pages. They typically extract their content from one or more back-end databases: some are database queries across a relational database to query a catalog or to summarise numeric information, and others may use a document database such as MongoDB or NoSQL to store larger units of content, such as blog posts or wiki articles.

In the design process, dynamic pages are often mocked-up or wireframed using static pages. The skillset needed to develop dynamic web pages is much broader than for a static page, involving server-side and database coding as well as client-side interface design. Even medium-sized dynamic projects are thus almost always a team effort.

When dynamic web pages first developed, they were typically coded directly in languages such as Perl, PHP or ASP. Some of these, notably PHP and ASP, used a 'template' approach where a server-side page resembled the structure of the completed client-side page, and data was inserted into places defined by 'tags'. This was a quicker means of development than coding in a purely procedural coding language such as Perl.

Both of these approaches have now been supplanted for many websites by higher-level application-focused tools such as content management systems. These build on top of general-purpose coding platforms and assume that a website exists to offer content according to one of several well-recognised models, such as a time-sequenced blog, a thematic magazine or news site, a wiki, or a user forum. These tools make the implementation of such a site very easy, and a purely organizational and design-based task, without requiring any coding.

Editing the content itself (as well as the template page) can be done both by means of the site itself and with the use of third-party software. The ability to edit all pages is provided only to a specific category of users (for example, administrators, or registered users). In some cases, anonymous users are allowed to edit certain web content, which is less frequent (for example, on forums – adding messages). An example of a site with an anonymous change is Wikipedia.

== Homepage design ==
Usability experts, including Jakob Nielsen and Kyle Soucy, have often emphasised homepage design for website success and asserted that the homepage is the most important page on a website. However, practitioners into the 2000s were starting to find that a growing amount of website traffic was bypassing the homepage, going directly to internal content pages through search engines, e-newsletters and RSS feeds. This led many practitioners to argue that homepages are less important than most people think. Jared Spool argued in 2007 that a site's homepage was actually the least important page on a website.

In 2012 and 2013, carousels (also called 'sliders' and 'rotating banners') have become an extremely popular design element on homepages, often used to showcase featured or recent content in a confined space. Many practitioners argue that carousels are an ineffective design element and hurt a website's search engine optimisation and usability.

== Occupations ==
There are two primary jobs involved in creating a website: the web designer and web developer, who often work closely together on a website. The web designers are responsible for the visual aspect, which includes the layout, colouring, and typography of a web page. Web designers will also have a working knowledge of markup languages such as HTML and CSS, although the extent of their knowledge will differ from one web designer to another. Particularly in smaller organizations, one person will need the necessary skills for designing and programming the full web page, while larger organizations may have a web designer responsible for the visual aspect alone.

Further jobs which may become involved in the creation of a website include:

- Graphic designers to create visuals for the site such as logos, layouts, and buttons
- Internet marketing specialists to help maintain web presence through strategic solutions on targeting viewers to the site, by using marketing and promotional techniques on the internet
- SEO writers to research and recommend the correct words to be incorporated into a particular website and make the website more accessible and found on numerous search engines
- Internet copywriter to create the written content of the page to appeal to the targeted viewers of the site
- User experience (UX) designer incorporates aspects of user-focused design considerations which include information architecture, user-centred design, user testing, interaction design, and occasionally visual design.

== Artificial intelligence and web design ==
ChatGPT and other AI models are being used to write and code websites, making their creation easier and faster. There are still discussions about the ethical implications of using artificial intelligence for design as the world becomes more familiar with using AI for time-consuming tasks used in design processes.

== See also ==
- Aesthetics
- Color theory
- Composition (visual arts)
- Cross-browser
- Design education
- Drawing
- Dark pattern
- European Design Awards
- First Things First 2000 manifesto
- Graphic art software
- Graphic design occupations
- Graphics
- Information graphics
- List of graphic design institutions
- List of graphic designers
- Logotype
- Outline of web design and web development
- Progressive Enhancement
- Style guide
- Web 2.0
- Web colors
- Web safe fonts
- Web usability
- Web application framework
- Website builder
- Website wireframe

=== Related disciplines ===
- Communication design
- Copywriting
- Desktop publishing
- Digital illustration
- Graphic design
- Interaction design
- Information design
- Light-on-dark color scheme
- Marketing communications
- Motion graphic design
- New media
- Search engine optimization (SEO)
- Technical Writer
- Typography
- User experience
- User interface design
- Web development
- Web animations
