= Google Web Designer =

Freeware application by Google

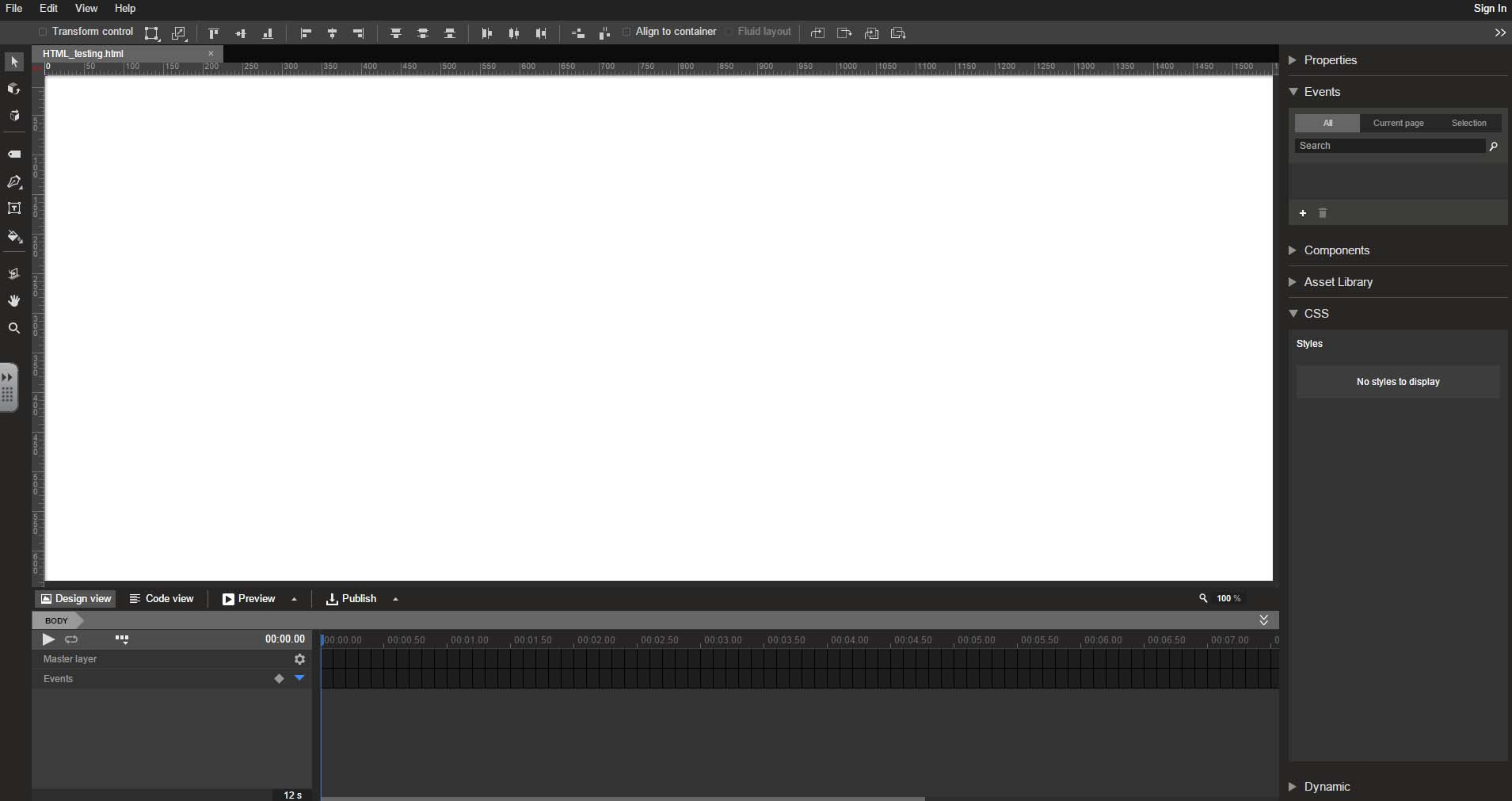
- Developer: Google
- Stable release: 16.0.3.0320 /
- Operating system: Windows, macOS, Linux
- Type: HTML editor
- License: proprietary software
- Website: Google Web Designer

Google Web Designer is a drag-and-drop page builder for Windows, macOS, and Linux from Google for creating interactive HTML5 ads and other HTML5 content. It offers a GUI with common design tools, such as a “Text” tool that integrates with Google Web Fonts, a “Shapes” tool, a “Pen” tool, and 3D tools. The advertising feature set includes components to add Google Maps, YouTube videos and more, as well as automatically including the tracking code events for DoubleClick and AdMob.

Google Web Designer's code view lets the user create CSS, JavaScript, and XML files, and uses syntax highlighting and code autocompletion that makes the code easier to write with fewer errors. Google Web Designer is free to download and use.

== See also ==
- Google Sites
