= Develop (Apple magazine) =

Develop: The Apple Technical Journal was a quarterly magazine published by Apple for a total of twenty-nine issues between 1990 and 1997. The hardcover journal consisted of highly technical information written primarily by Apple engineers for Apple developers. As a result of Apple's acquisition of NeXT Computer and subsequent return of Steve Jobs in 1997, Develop's production was terminated within Apple. This action was done to return Apple to a state of profitability. Develop: The Apple Technical Journal lives on in a digital format as a guest column within MacTech to this day.

== Content ==
Develop was written by Apple engineers for Apple developers and could almost be described as a textbook rather than a magazine. Every issue is packed full of detailed information regarding software and hardware tools relevant at the time of publishing, along with pages upon pages of example code. Most issues contained over one hundred pages of text, pictures, and diagrams, and each issue contained over ten articles and columns. These entries include a common theme of hardware and software troubleshooting, tips and tricks for all aspects of coding, tutorials for new software, and countless other computer-related instructions.

== History ==
Apple Develop had twenty-nine quarterly issues between 1990 and 1997. It was one of many products Apple created in the absence of their co-founder, Steve Jobs, between 1985 and 1997. The products that this Cupertino, California-based technology giant released during that period of time had varying levels of success, leaving Apple in financially rocky territory. These products included the Apple Newton, Apple Pippin, Apple QuickTake, and, of course, Apple Develop. In 1997, Steve Jobs returned to Apple after Apple acquired his company, NeXT Computers, for its valuable resources. He took on the role of CEO and began making significant changes. These included the closure of many departments and the cancelation of several hardware and software products. Develop was one of the products affected by the massive restructuring of Apple that took place in 1997. The cancelation of Develop was likely done to assist in returning Apple to a state of profitability and focus its resources on quality over quantity of products. The magazine is now accessible through a few digital sources. They include vintageapple.org and mactech.com, which are both accessible through the external links section.

=== Chronology ===
Issue	Date	Overview
1	January 1990	Implementation and use of various color tools, debugging declaration ROMs, and other Apple II related matters.
2	April 1990	Overview of objects in C++ and pascal, and discussions regarding using MacApp, Apple II Macintosh, and object-based applications.
3	July 1990	Overview of CD-ROM implementations, new software, and help with Macintosh and Apple II.
4	October 1990	C++ discussion and updates regarding Apples hardware and software.
5	Winter 1991	Macintosh tools, scanning, printing, and color information, and general Apple software and hardware discussion.
6	Spring 1991	Threads on Macintosh, new workflow efficiencies, and help with the Macintosh and Apple II.
7	Summer 1991	Introduction to QuickTime, C++ and other coding discussion, and system 7 information.
8	Autumn 1991	Debugging, Apple II and Macintosh discussion, and graphics discussion.
9	Winter 1992	Overview of many color and UI elements of System 7, and introduction of puzzle page.
X	May 1992	Printing tips, color management, and various optimizations.
XI	August 1992	Information regarding audio and discussion of distributed computing.
XII	December 1992	Overview of debugging, C++ and other coding information, and animation techniques.
XIII	March 1993	Continued discussion of debugging and digital coloring.
XIV	June 1993	Discussion regarding video and 3D media formats.
XV	September 1993	Usage of Quickdraw GX and component management.
XVI	December 1993	PowerPC transition, and tips regarding many of Apples software tool offerings.
XVII	March 1994	Continued PowerPC discussion, file format compatibility, and developer tips.
XVIII	June 1994	Apple Guide usage, graphics on Macintosh, and the implementation of multiple software tools and methods.
XIX	September 1994	QuickDraw GX usage and information for PowerPC use on Macintosh.
XX	December 1994	Apple open collaboration environment usage and help with Apple software tools.
XXI	March 1995	Introduction to OpenDoc graphics, assembly in PowerPC, hierarchical structures, and scripting methods.
XXII	June 1995	Overview of QuickDraw 3D, Mac customizations, and Apples future plans.
XXIII	September 1995	QuickTime music usage, sharing documents and preferences, and a peer into the next generation of Macintosh.
XXIV	December 1995	Scripting tips, help with storage management, and guidelines effective alerts.
XXV	March 1996	Using QuickDraw 3D to create QuickTime VR moves, graphics tips and Apple Newton tips.
XXVI	June 1996	Mac OS 8 preparation and continued QuickTime discussion.
XXVII	September 1996	Speech recognition on Mac, working with OpenDoc, and Mac OS 8 compatibility with System 7.
XXVIII	December 1996	QuickDraw help, debugging aids, and coding objects for advanced scriptability.
XXIX	March 1997	Memory usage in OpenDoc, continued QuickDraw help, and Apple Newton internet enabler usage.
