= JSHint =

JavaScript code analysis software

- Original authors: Anton Kovalyov, forked from original code by Douglas Crockford
- Release: February 18, 2011; 15 years ago
- Stable release: 2.13.6 / November 12, 2022; 3 years ago
- Written in: JavaScript
- Operating system: Cross-platform
- Available in: English
- Type: Static code analysis
- License: MIT license
- Website: jshint.com
- Repository: github.com/jshint/jshint

JSHint is a static code analysis tool used in software development for checking if JavaScript source code complies with coding rules. JSHint was created in 2011 by Anton Kovalyov as a fork of the JSLint project (by Douglas Crockford). Anton and others felt JSLint was getting "too opinionated", and did not allow enough customization options. The JSHint maintainers publish both an online version, and a command-line version.

The online version is accessible through the official website in which users can paste code to run the application online. The command-line version of JSHint (distributed as a Node.js module), enables automated linting processes by integrating JSHint into a project's development workflow.

== License ==
Until 2020, JSHint was distributed under the MIT license except for one file which was still under the JSLint License (a slightly modified version of the MIT license). The additional clause specified that the software shall be used "for Good and not Evil". This clause, according to the Free Software Foundation, made the software non-free.

In August 2020, all code under the previous JSLint License was replaced with open-source software, making the software fully free software.

== See also ==
- List of tools for static code analysis, JavaScript
