= Daniel Glazman =

French programmer

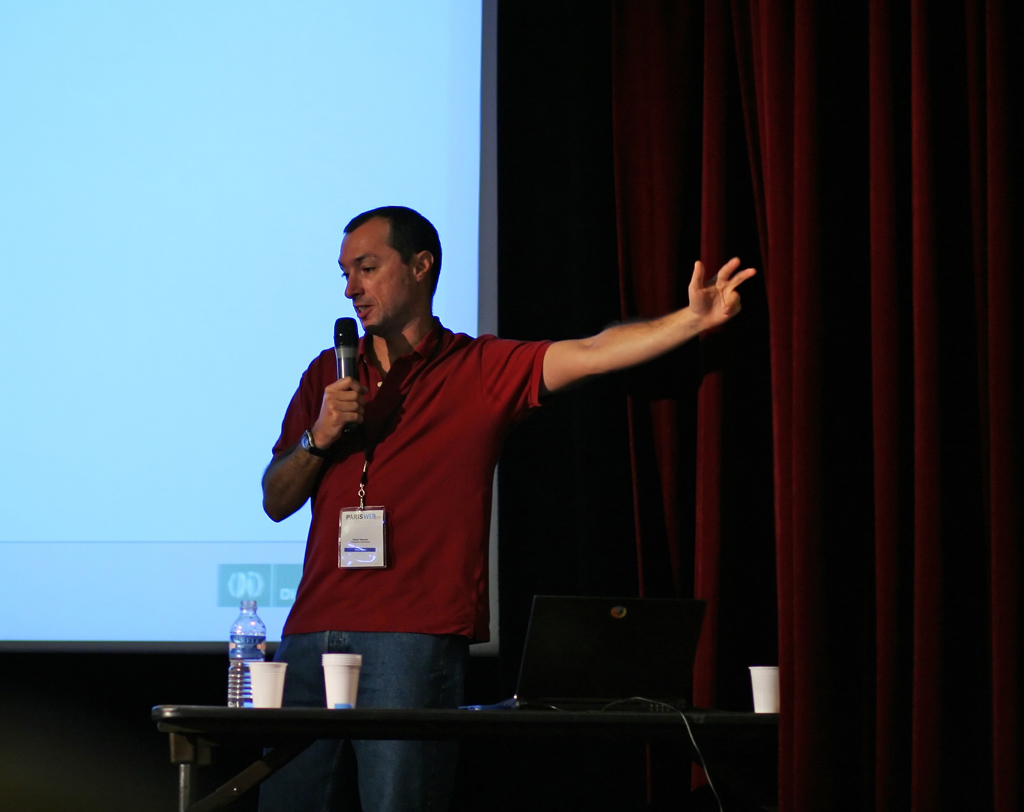
- Glazman
- Education: École Polytechnique
- Occupation: Programmer
- Website: glazman.org

Daniel Glazman is a JavaScript programmer, best known for his work on Mozilla's Editor and Composer components and Nvu, a standalone version of the Mozilla Composer, created for Linspire Corporation. He lives in France.

Glazman studied at École Polytechnique, graduating in 1989, and Télécom ParisTech, graduating in 1991. He started work at Grif SA, a software company specialising in SGML editors. He worked at the Research & Development Centre of Electricité de France from 1994 to 2000, holding several positions from research engineer to team manager. During 2000 he also worked at Amazon.fr and Halogen before joining Netscape Communications Corporation to work on Mozilla's CSS rendering, Editor and Composer.

Glazman was involved in the standardization of HTML 4 and CSS 2 and remains active in W3C's CSS Working Group. He was appointed co-chairman of the CSS Working Group in April 2008.

He runs his own company, Disruptive Innovations, which produced the latest iteration of his work on web editors, BlueGriffon.

From September 2013-June 2014 he worked at the Samsung Open Source Group.
