= Maqetta =

HTML editor

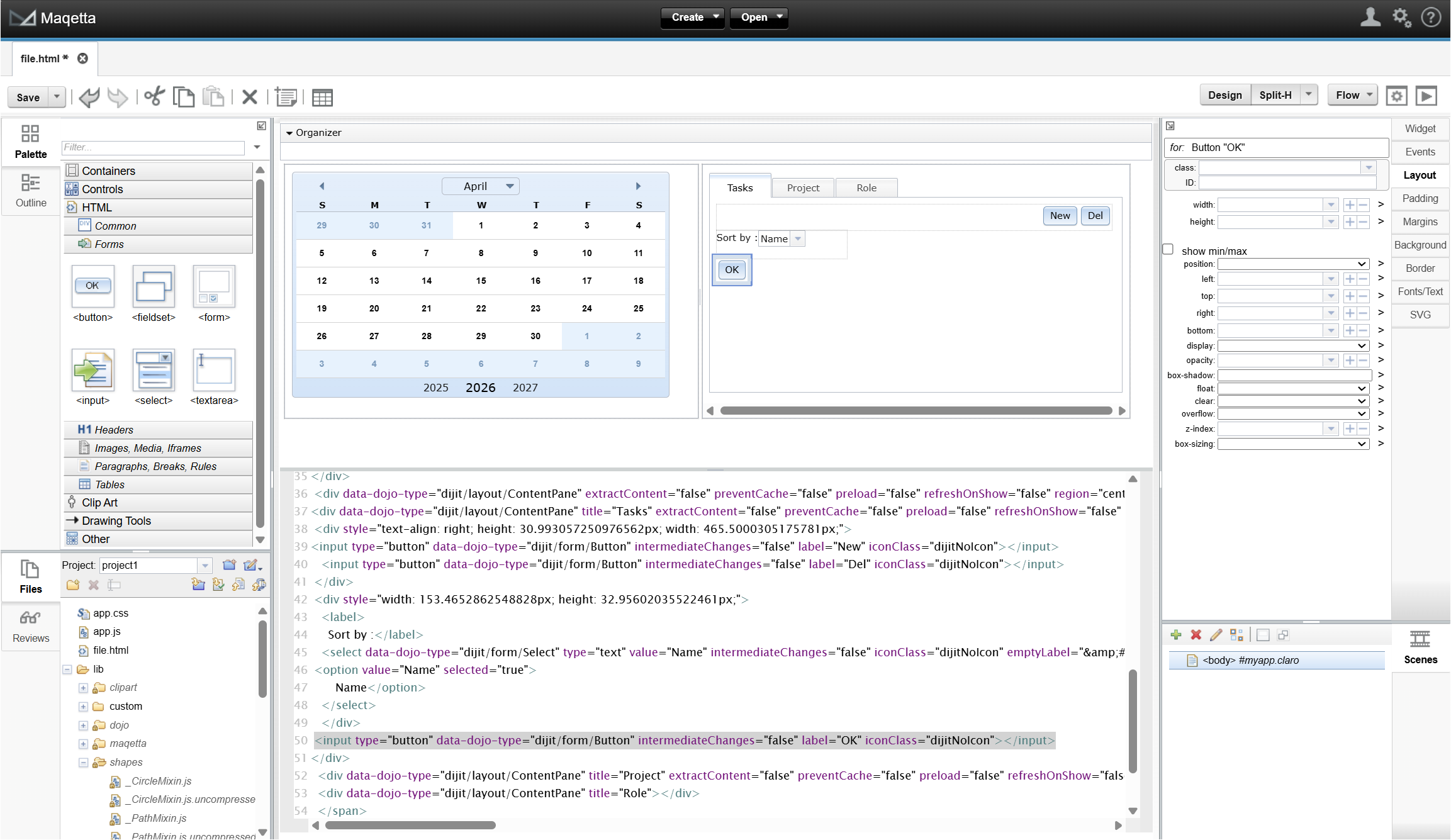
- Maqetta running on Windows 11 in Chrome
- Original author: IBM
- Developer: Dojo Foundation
- Final release: 10.0.2 / 3 July 2013
- Written in: JavaScript, HTML, Java
- Platform: any HTML5-enabled web browser
- Size: 97 MB uncompressed (86.1 MB .ZIP download)
- Available in: English
- Type: HTML editor, Software as a service
- License: BSD-3-Clause or AFL-2.1
- Website: maqetta.org
- Repository: https://github.com/maqetta/maqetta

Maqetta was a free and open-source, web-based WYSIWYG HTML editor designed to edit HTML5 documents and web applications. Its name is derived from the Spanish word maqueta, that means "mock-up". The Maqetta application itself is authored in HTML, and therefore runs in the browser, without requiring additional plugins or downloads.

As of May 2013, active development of Maqetta has stopped.

Maqetta was developed by IBM and later donated to the Dojo Foundation as an open-source project under the terms of either the BSD-3-Clause or the AFL-2.1.

The editor was developed in response to a perceived need for open-source HTML5 programming tools equivalent in capability to those available for Adobe Flash and Microsoft Silverlight.

The downloadable server component can run on a remote server or on the same computer as the client software (the web browser).

== See also ==
- Dojo Toolkit
