= Douglas Crockford =

American computer programmer

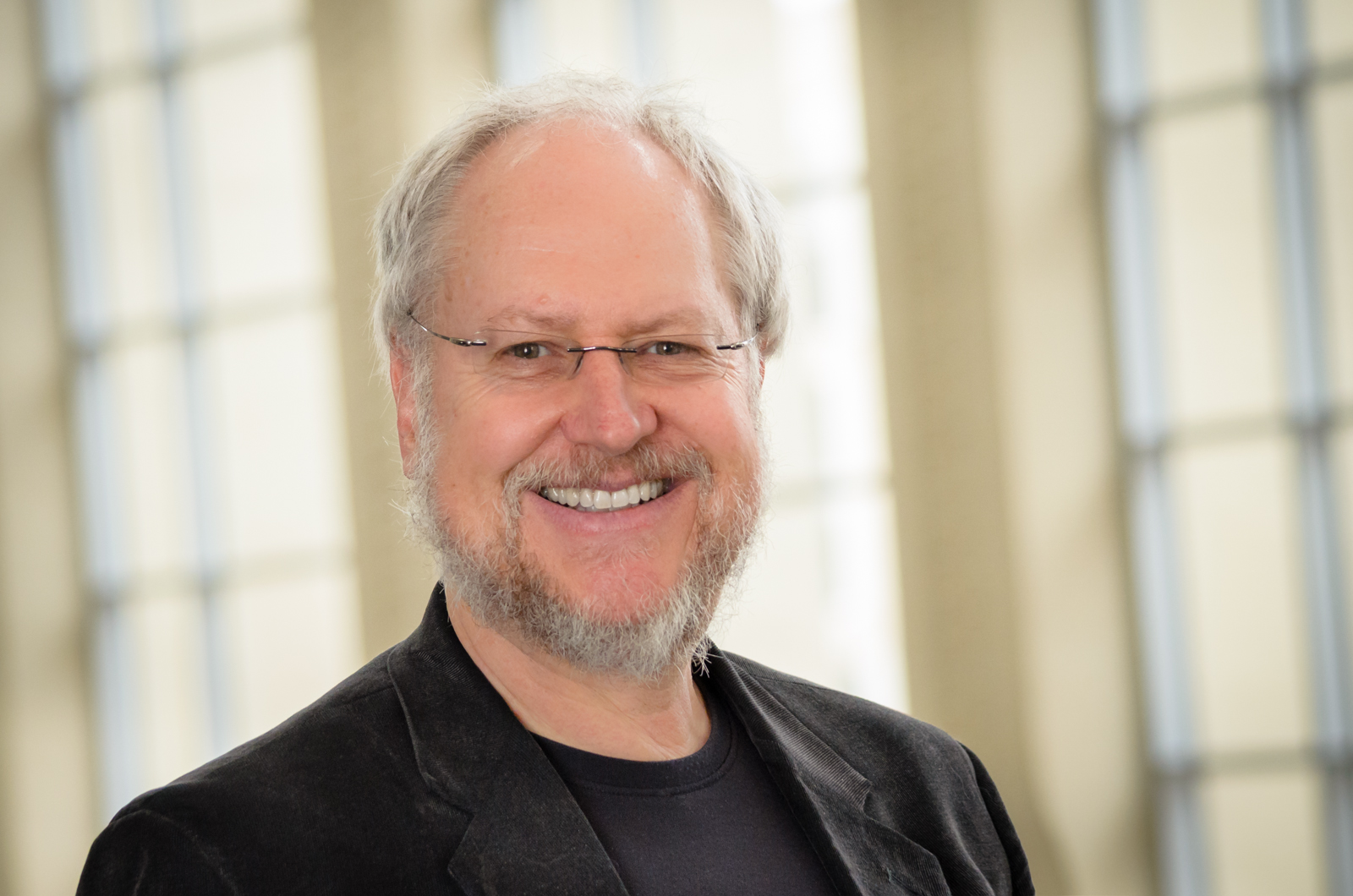
- Crockford in 2013
- Education: San Francisco State University
- Occupation: Senior JavaScript Architect
- Employer: Virgule-Solidus
- Known for: JavaScript Object Notation
- Website: crockford.com

Douglas Crockford is an American computer programmer who is involved in the development of the JavaScript language. He (Note: Crockford primarily uses the neopronouns pe/per, but has also used the traditional masculine pronouns he/him on his personal site. This article uses he for consistency with the latter writings because Crockford has expressed a preference for "he", "she" (for nominative where applying) and the neopronoun "pe" over the singular "they", which he describes as confusing.) specified the data format JSON (JavaScript Object Notation), and has developed various JavaScript related tools such as the static code analyzer JSLint and minifier JSMin. Crockford wrote the book JavaScript: The Good Parts, published in 2008, followed by How JavaScript Works in 2018. He was a senior JavaScript architect at PayPal until 2019, and is also a writer and speaker on JavaScript, JSON, and related web technologies.

== Education ==
Crockford earned a degree in Radio and Television from San Francisco State University in 1975, he took classes in FORTRAN and worked with a university lab's computer.

== Career ==
Crockford purchased an Atari 8-bit computer in 1980 and wrote the game Galahad and the Holy Grail for the Atari Program Exchange (APX), which resulted in Chris Crawford hiring him at Atari, Inc. While at Atari, he wrote another game, Burgers!, for APX and a number of experimental audio/visual demos that were freely distributed.

After Warner Communications sold the company, Crockford joined National Semiconductor. In 1984 he joined Lucasfilm, and later Paramount Pictures. Crockford became known on video game oriented listservs in the early 1990s after posting the memoir "The Expurgation of Maniac Mansion" to a video gaming bulletin board. The memoir documented their efforts to censor the computer game Maniac Mansion to Nintendo's satisfaction so that Nintendo could release it as a cartridge, and Crockford's mounting frustrations as Nintendo's demands became more obscure and confusing.

Together with Randy Farmer and Chip Morningstar, Crockford founded Electric Communities and was its CEO from 1994 to 1995. He was involved in the development of the programming language E. Crockford was the founder of State Software (also known as Veil Networks) and its CTO from 2001 to 2002. During their time at State Software, he popularized the JSON data format, based upon existing JavaScript language constructs, as a lightweight alternative to XML. Crockford obtained the domain name json.org in 2002, and put up their description of the format there. In July 2006, he specified the format officially, as RFC 4627.

In 2008 Crockford published a book announcing their discovery that JavaScript, contrary to prevailing opinion, has good parts. He describes this as "heresy", and as "maybe the first important discovery of the 21st century", noting that it came as a "big surprise to the JavaScript community, and the world at large". Crockford attributes the discovery to having read the ECMAScript Standard. He also noted that the specification document is of "extremely poor quality", "hard to read" and "hard to understand", and say that the ECMA and the TC39 committee "should be deeply embarrassed".

== Software license for "Good, not Evil" ==
In 2002, in reference to President George Bush's war on "evildoers", Crockford started releasing the JSMin software under a customized open source MIT License, with the added requirement that "The Software shall be used for Good, not Evil". This clause was carried over to JSMin-PHP, a variation of JSMin by Ryan Grove. This software was hosted on Google Code until December 2009 when, due to the additional clause, Google determined that the license was not compliant with the definition of free and open source software, which does not permit any restriction on how software may be used. JSMin-PHP was forced to migrate to a new hosting provider. According to the GNU project, the license conflicts with Freedom 0 of the Free Software definition, and although "it may be unenforceable, we cannot presume that", therefore non-free.

Crockford's license has caused problems for some open source projects who mistook the license for an open source variant of the MIT license. Affected open source developers have asked him to change the license, but he has continued to use it. In 2022, Crockford changed the license in the JSON Java implementation to release it into the public domain.

== Bibliography ==
- JavaScript: The Good Parts. O'Reilly. 2008. ISBN 978-0-596-51774-8. OCLC 192027457.
- How JavaScript Works (PDF). Virgule-Solidus. 2018. ISBN 978-1949815009. OCLC 1076490570.
