= Validator =

Software to check code or a document

A validator is a computer program used to check the validity or syntactical correctness of a fragment of code or document. The term is commonly used in the context of validating HTML, CSS, and XML documents like RSS feeds, though it can be used for any defined format or language.

Accessibility validators are automated tools that are designed to verify compliance of a web page or a web site with respect to one or more accessibility guidelines (such as WCAG, Section 508 or those associated with national laws such as the Stanca Act).

== See also ==
- CSS HTML Validator for Windows
- W3C Markup Validation Service
- Well-formed element
- XML validation
