= HTML editor =

Software for editing HTML

An HTML editor is a program used for editing HTML, the markup of a web page. Although the HTML markup in a web page can be controlled with any text editor, specialized HTML editors can offer convenience, added functionality, and organisation. For example, many HTML editors handle not only HTML, but also related technologies such as CSS, JavaScript, or ECMAScript. In some cases, they also manage communication with remote web servers via FTP and WebDAV, and version control systems such as Subversion or Git. Many word processing, graphic design, and page layout programs that are not dedicated to web design, such as Microsoft Word or QuarkXPress, also have the ability to edit & export HTML documents.

== Text editors ==
Text editors intended for use with HTML usually provide at least syntax highlighting. Some editors additionally feature templates, toolbars, and keyboard shortcuts to quickly insert common HTML elements and structures. Wizards, tooltip prompts, and autocompletion may help with common tasks.

Text editors commonly used for HTML typically include either built-in functions or integration with external tools for such tasks as version control, link-checking and validation, code cleanup and formatting, spell-checking, uploading by FTP or WebDAV, and structuring as a project. Some functions, such as link checking or validation, may use online tools, requiring a network connection.

Text editors require user understanding of HTML and any other web technologies the designer wishes to use, like CSS, JavaScript and server-side scripting languages.

To ease this requirement, some editors allow editing of the markup in more visually organized modes than simple color highlighting, but in modes not considered WYSIWYG. These editors typically include the option of using palette windows or dialog boxes to edit the text-based parameters of selected objects. These palettes allow editing parameters in individual fields, or inserting new tags by filling out an onscreen form, and may include additional widgets to present and select options when editing parameters (such as previewing an image or text styles) or an outline editor to expand and collapse HTML objects and properties.

== WYSIWYG HTML editors ==
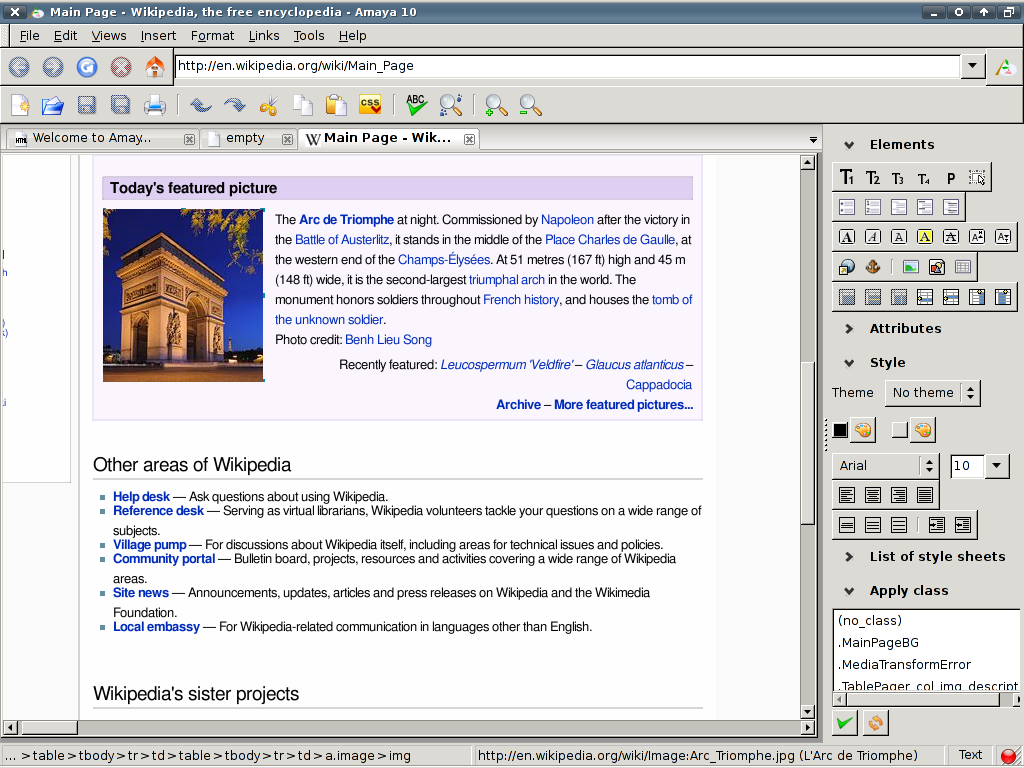
Amaya 10 HTML editor

WYSIWYG HTML editors provide an editing interface that resembles how the page will be displayed in a web browser. Because using a WYSIWYG editor may not require any HTML knowledge, they are often easier for an inexperienced computer user to get started with.

The WYSIWYG view is achieved by embedding a layout engine. This may be custom-written or based on one used in a web browser. The goal is that, at all times during editing, the rendered result should represent what will be seen later in a typical web browser.

WYSIWYM (what you see is what you mean) is an alternative paradigm to WYSIWYG editors. Instead of focusing on the format or presentation of the document, it preserves the intended meaning of each element. For example, page headers, sections, paragraphs, etc., are labeled as such in the editing program and displayed appropriately in the browser.

=== Difficulties in achieving WYSIWYG ===
A given HTML document will have an inconsistent appearance on various platforms and computers for several reasons:

Different browsers and applications will render the same markup differently.
The same page may display slightly differently, for example, in Chrome, Safari, Edge, Internet Explorer and Firefox on a high-resolution screen, but it will look very different in the perfectly valid text-only Lynx browser. It needs to be rendered differently again on a PDA, an internet-enabled television, and on a mobile phone. Usability in a speech or braille browser, or via a screen-reader working with a conventional browser, will place demands on entirely different aspects of the underlying HTML. All an author can do is suggest an appearance.
Web browsers, like all computer software, have bugs.
They may not conform to current standards. It is hopeless to try to design Web pages around all of the common browsers' current bugs: each time a new version of each browser comes out, a significant proportion of the World Wide Web would need re-coding to suit the new bugs and the new fixes. It is generally considered much wiser to design to standards, staying away from 'bleeding edge' features until they settle down, and then wait for the browser developers to catch up to your pages, rather than the other way round. For instance, no one can argue that CSS is still 'cutting edge' as there is now widespread support available in common browsers for all the major features, even if many WYSIWYG and other editors have not yet entirely caught up.
A single visual style can represent multiple semantic meanings
Semantic meaning, derived from the underlying structure of the HTML document, is important for search engines and also for various accessibility tools. On paper, we can tell from context and experience whether bold text represents a title, emphasis, or something else. But it is very difficult to convey this distinction in a WYSIWYG editor. Simply making a piece of text bold in a WYSIWYG editor is not sufficient to tell the reader *why* the text is bold – what the boldness represents semantically.
Modern websites are rarely constructed in a way that makes WYSIWYG useful
Modern websites typically use a content management system or some other template processor-based means of constructing pages on the fly using content stored in a database. Individual pages are never stored in a filesystem as they may be designed and edited in a WYSIWYG editor, thus some form of abstracted template-based layout is inevitable, invalidating one of the main benefits of using a WYSIWYG editor.

== Valid HTML markup ==
HTML is a structured markup language. There are certain rules on how HTML must be written if it is to conform to W3C standards for the World Wide Web. Following these rules means that web sites are accessible on all types and makes of computer, to able-bodied and people with disabilities, and also on Wireless devices like mobile phones and PDAs, with their limited bandwidths and screen sizes. However, most HTML documents on the web do not meet the requirements of W3C standards. In a study conducted in 2011 on the 350 most popular web sites (selected by the Alexa index), 94 percent of websites fail the web standards markup and style sheet validation tests, or apply character encoding improperly. Even those syntactically correct documents may be inefficient due to an unnecessary use of repetition, or based upon rules that have been deprecated for some years. Current W3C recommendations on the use of CSS with HTML were first formalised by W3C in 1996 and have been revised and refined since then.

These guidelines emphasise the separation of content (HTML or XHTML) from style (CSS). This has the benefit of delivering the style information once for a whole site, not repeated in each page or HTML element. This poses a challenge for WYSIWYG editor designers who have been struggling ever since with how best to present these concepts to their users without exposing them to the underlying reality.

Valid markup is more likely to be rendered consistently and accessibly across different browsers and devices. Validation tools such as the W3C HTML Validator and W3C CSS Validator allow authors to check for syntactical and other errors in their HTML markup.

In some countries, accessibility of web pages by those with physical, eyesight or other disabilities is mandated by law. The United States's Americans with Disabilities Act and the United Kingdom's Disability Discrimination Act require this for websites operated by publicly funded organizations. Making pages accessible is more complex than just making them valid; that is a prerequisite but there are many other factors to be considered. Good web design, whether done using a WYSIWYG tool or not needs to take account of these too.

Whatever software tools are used to design, create and maintain web pages, the quality of the underlying HTML is dependent on the skill of the person who works on the page. Some knowledge of HTML, CSS and other scripting languages as well as a familiarity with the current W3C recommendations in these areas will help any designer produce better web pages, with a WYSIWYG HTML editor and without.

== See also ==
- Comparison of HTML editors
- List of HTML editors
- Web template system
- Website builder
- Visual editor
- Validator
