= List of Microsoft software =

Microsoft is a developer of personal computer software. It is best known for its Windows operating system, Internet Explorer and subsequent Microsoft Edge web browsers, the Microsoft Office family of productivity software plus services, and the Visual Studio IDE. The company also publishes books (through Microsoft Press) and video games (through Xbox Game Studios), and produces its own line of hardware. The following is a list of notable Microsoft software applications.

== Software development ==
- Azure DevOps
  - Azure DevOps Server (formerly Team Foundation Server and Visual Studio Team System)
  - Azure DevOps Services (formerly Visual Studio Team Services, Visual Studio Online and Team Foundation Service)
- BASICA
- Bosque
- CLR Profiler
- GitHub
  - GitHub Desktop
  - GitHub Copilot
  - npm
  - Spectrum
  - Dependabot
- GW-BASIC
- IronRuby
- IronPython
- JScript
- Microsoft Liquid Motion
- Microsoft BASIC, also licensed as:
  - Altair BASIC
  - AmigaBASIC
  - Applesoft BASIC
  - Commodore BASIC
  - Color BASIC
  - MBASIC
  - Spectravideo Extended BASIC
  - TRS-80 Level II BASIC
- Microsoft MACRO-80
- Microsoft Macro Assembler
- Microsoft Small Basic
- Microsoft Visual SourceSafe
- Microsoft XNA
- Microsoft WebMatrix
- MSX BASIC
- NuGet
- QBasic and QuickBASIC
- TASC (The AppleSoft Compiler)
- TypeScript
- VBScript
- Visual Studio
  - Microsoft Visual Studio Express
  - Visual Basic
  - Visual Basic .NET
  - Visual Basic for Applications
  - Visual C++
    - C++/CLI
    - Managed Extensions for C++
  - Visual C#
  - Visual FoxPro
  - Visual J++
  - Visual J#
  - Visual Studio Code
  - Visual Studio Lab Management
  - Visual Studio Tools for Applications
  - Visual Studio Tools for Office
  - VSTS Profiler
- Windows API
- Windows SDK
- WordBASIC
- Xbox Development Kit

== 3D ==
- 3D Builder
- 3D Scan (requires a Kinect for Xbox One sensor)
- 3D Viewer
- AltspaceVR
- Bing Maps for Enterprise (formerly "Bing Maps Platform" and "Microsoft Virtual Earth")
- Direct3D
- Havok
- HoloStudio
- Kinect
- Microsoft Mesh
- Paint 3D
- Simplygon

== Educational ==
- Bing
- Bing Bar
- Browstat
- Creative Writer
- Flip
- LinkedIn
- Microsoft Comic Chat
- Microsoft Math Solver
- Microsoft Pay (mobile payment and digital wallet service)
- Microsoft Silverlight
- MSN
- Office Online
- OneDrive
- Outlook.com
- Skype
- Skype for Business
- Skype Qik
- Yammer

=== Subscription services ===
- Microsoft 365
- Xbox Game Pass
- Xbox Game Pass Ultimate
- Xbox Live Gold

== Maintenance and administration ==
- Microsoft Anti-Virus
- Microsoft Desktop Optimization Pack
- Microsoft Intune
- Microsoft Security Essentials
- Sysinternals utilities
  - PageDefrag
  - Process Explorer
  - Process Monitor
- SyncToy
- Windows Live OneCare
- Windows SteadyState

== Operating systems ==
- MS-DOS
  - SB-DOS
  - COMPAQ-DOS
  - NCR-DOS
  - Z-DOS
  - 86-DOS
- Microsoft Windows
  - DOS-based
    - Windows 1.0
    - Windows 2.0
    - Windows 2.1
    - Windows 3.0
    - Windows 3.1
    - Windows for Workgroups 3.11
  - Windows 9x
    - Windows 95
    - Windows 98
    - Windows ME
  - Windows NT
    - Windows NT 3.1
    - Windows NT 3.5
    - Windows NT 3.51
    - Windows NT 4.0
    - Windows 2000
    - Windows XP
    - Windows Fundamentals for Legacy PCs
    - Windows Vista
    - Windows 7
    - Windows 8
      - Windows RT
    - Windows 8.1
    - Windows 10
    - Windows 11
  - Windows Server
    - Windows Server 2003
    - Windows Server 2008
    - Windows Server 2012
    - Windows Server 2016
    - Windows Server 2019
    - Windows Server 2022
    - Windows Server 2025
  - Windows CE
  - Windows Embedded
  - Windows Mobile
  - Windows Phone
  - Windows Preinstallation Environment
- MSX-DOS
- OS/2
- HomeOS
- Midori
- MIDAS
- Singularity
- Xenix
- Zune

== Productivity ==
=== Applications ===
- Microsoft Office
  - Microsoft Access
  - Microsoft Designer
  - Microsoft Excel
  - Microsoft Lens (mobile)
  - Microsoft OneNote
  - Microsoft Outlook
  - Microsoft PowerPoint
  - Microsoft Project
  - Microsoft Sway
  - Microsoft Visio
  - Microsoft Word
  - Office Mobile
  - Office Remote (mobile)
- Microsoft Power Platform
  - AI Builder
  - Copilot Studio
  - Dataverse
  - Microsoft Power BI
  - Power Apps
  - Microsoft Power Automate
  - Power Automate Desktop
  - Power Pages
  - Power Virtual Agents
- Microsoft Dynamics
  - Microsoft Dynamics 365 Finance
  - Microsoft Dynamics 365 Business Central
  - Microsoft Dynamics 365 Sales (previously Microsoft Dynamics CRM)
- Others
  - Clipchamp
  - Microsoft PowerToys
  - Microsoft Lists
  - Microsoft Loop
  - Microsoft Teams
  - Microsoft SwiftKey
  - Microsoft Syntex
  - Microsoft Authenticator

=== Suites ===
==== Microsoft Office ====
- Microsoft Office 3.0
- Microsoft Office 95
- Microsoft Office 97
- Microsoft Office 2000
- Microsoft Office XP
- Microsoft Office 2003
- Microsoft Office 2007
- Microsoft Office 2010
- Microsoft Office 2013
- Microsoft Office 2016
- Microsoft Office 2019
- Microsoft Office 2021
- Microsoft Office 2024

==== Microsoft Office for Mac ====
- Microsoft Office 98 Macintosh Edition
- Microsoft Office 2001
- Microsoft Office v. X
- Office 2004 for Mac
- Microsoft Office 2008 for Mac
- Microsoft Office for Mac 2011
- Microsoft Office 2016 for Mac
- Microsoft Office 2019
- Microsoft Office 2021
- Microsoft Office 2024

== Servers ==
- Microsoft Azure
- Microsoft BackOffice Server
- Microsoft BizTalk Server
- Microsoft Commerce Server
- Microsoft Content Management Server
- Microsoft Exchange Server
- Microsoft Fabric
  - Analytics
  - Data Engineering
  - Data Factory
  - Data Science
  - Data Warehouse
  - Databases
  - Governance
  - IQ
  - OneLake
  - Real-Time Intelligence
- Microsoft Forefront
  - Exchange Online Protection
  - Forefront Identity Manager
  - Microsoft Forefront Threat Management Gateway
  - Microsoft Forefront Unified Access Gateway
- Microsoft Host Integration Server
- Microsoft Identity Integration Server
- Microsoft Merchant Server
- Microsoft Office PerformancePoint Server
- Microsoft Project Server
  - Microsoft Office Project Portfolio Server
- Microsoft SharePoint
- Microsoft Site Server
- Microsoft Speech Server
- Microsoft SQL Server
- Microsoft System Center
  - System Center Advisor
  - System Center Configuration Manager
  - System Center Data Protection Manager
  - System Center Essentials
  - System Center Operations Manager
  - System Center Service Manager
  - System Center Virtual Machine Manager
- Microsoft Virtual Server
- Search Server
- Skype for Business Server
- Windows Admin Center

== Video games ==
=== Xbox Game Studios ===
- Xbox Game Studios Video Games
  - Age of Empires series
  - Banjo-Kazooie series
  - Battletoads series
  - Blinx series
  - Conker series
  - Crackdown series
  - Crimson Skies series
  - Fable series
  - Forza series
  - Fuzion Frenzy series
  - Gears of War series (rebranded)
  - Gears series (formerly Gears of War)
  - Halo series
  - Hellblade series
  - Killer Instinct series
  - Kinect Sports series
  - Line Rider series
  - Lips series
  - MechAssault series
  - Microsoft Flight Simulator series
  - Midtown Madness series
  - Minecraft series
  - Monster Truck Madness series
  - Motocross Madness series
  - NFL Fever series
  - NBA Inside Drive series
  - Ori series
  - Perfect Dark series
  - Pillars of Eternity series
  - Project Gotham Racing series
  - Psychonauts series
  - RalliSport Challenge series
  - Rise of Nations series
  - Scene It? series
  - Shadowrun series
  - State of Decay series
  - The Bard's Tale series
  - The Outer Worlds series
  - Viva Piñata series
  - Wastelands series
  - Zoo Tycoon series

=== Bethesda Softworks ===
- Bethesda Softworks Video Games
  - Commander Keen series
  - Dishonored series
  - Doom series
  - Fallout series
  - Prey series
  - Quake series
  - Rage series
  - The Elder Scrolls series
  - The Evil Within series
  - Wolfenstein series

=== Other games included with Windows ===
Video games included or bundled with Microsoft Windows

- Microsoft FreeCell
- Microsoft Hearts
- Microsoft Mahjong
- Microsoft Minesweeper
- Microsoft Solitaire Collection
- Microsoft Ultimate Word Games
- Chess Titans
- FreeCell
- Hearts
- Internet-Backgammon
- Internet-Checkers
- Internet-Spades
- Mahjong Titans
- Purble Place
- Solitaire
- Spider Solitaire

=== For PCs running Windows ===
- Microsoft Entertainment Pack series
  - Microsoft Entertainment Pack 1
  - Microsoft Entertainment Pack 2
  - Microsoft Entertainment Pack 3
  - Microsoft Entertainment Pack 4
  - The Best of Microsoft Entertainment Pack
- Microsoft Entertainment Pack: The Puzzle Collection
- Microsoft Arcade series
  - Microsoft Arcade
  - Microsoft Return of Arcade
  - Microsoft Revenge of Arcade
- Microsoft Pinball Arcade

== Web services ==
- Clipchamp\
- Microsoft Bookings
- Microsoft Forms
- Microsoft Ignition, a music network operated by Microsoft that spans across Windows PCs, Xbox 360 gaming console and Zune music player. Ignition makes available music and music videos across all supported device types and also can be used for promotion of musical artists.
- Microsoft Planner
- Microsoft Sway
- Office on the web
- Outlook.com
- Outlook on the web

== Windows components ==
- Character Map (Windows)
- ClickOnce
- Command Prompt (formerly MS-DOS Prompt)
- DirectX
- Disk Cleanup
- Ease of Access (formerly Utility Manager)
- Feedback Hub
- File Explorer
- Internet Information Services
- Hyper-V
- Microsoft Agent
- Microsoft Edge
- Microsoft Magnifier
- Microsoft Narrator
- Microsoft Notepad
- Microsoft Paint
- Microsoft Photos
- Microsoft Speech API
- Microsoft Store
- On-Screen Keyboard
- PowerShell
- Registry Editor
- Windows Calculator
- Windows Camera
- Windows Chat
- Windows Clock
- Windows Contacts
- Windows Defender
- Windows Disk Defragmenter (succeeded by Defragment and Optimize Drives)
- Windows Easy Transfer (formerly Files and Settings Transfer Wizard)
- Windows Installer
- Windows Media Player
- Windows Photo Viewer
- Windows Speech Recognition
- Windows Subsystem for Linux (WSL)
- Windows To Go

== Miscellaneous ==
- Microsoft Bob
- Microsoft Home
- Microsoft Plus!

== Scheduled to be discontinued ==
Software that are no longer in development and scheduled to be discontinued in the future:

=== 2027 ===
- Microsoft To Do

== Discontinued software ==
Microsoft has retired many offerings, either because of obsolescence, integration into other Microsoft products, or lack of interest. Microsoft's discontinued offerings are sometimes referred to as "Microsoft Graveyard", an allusion to Google Graveyard.

=== 2026 ===
- Microsoft 3D Viewer
- Microsoft Lens
- Microsoft Publisher
- Microsoft Whiteboard
- Teams Live Chat

=== 2025 ===
- Microsoft Dev Home
- Microsoft Math Solver
- Microsoft Movies & TV
- Outlook Lite
- Skype
- Visual Studio App Center
- Windows Bridge for iOS
- Windows Maps
- Windows Subsystem for Android

=== 2024 ===
- Flip
- Hyper-V Server
- Microsoft Delve
- Microsoft Stream
- Paint 3D
- Windows Calendar
- Windows Mail
- Windows Mixed Reality
- Windows Server Essentials
- WordPad
- Xamarin
- Xbox Games Store
- Yammer

=== 2023 ===
- Azure Kinect
- Microsoft Cortana
- Microsoft Kaizala

=== 2022 ===
- Atom
- Groove Music
- Internet Explorer
- Windows Storage Server

=== 2021 ===
- Gears Pop
- Image Composite Editor
- Microsoft Academic
- Minecraft Earth
- People

=== 2020 ===
- EdgeHTML
- Microsoft Edge Legacy
- Mixer
- Remix 3D
- Wunderlist

=== 2019 ===
- Microsoft Band
- Microsoft HealthVault
- Zo

=== 2018 ===
- Microsoft Classroom
- Windows MultiPoint Server

=== 2017 ===
- CodePlex
- Microsoft Word Viewer
- PhotoSynth
- So.cl
- Windows Essentials
  - Microsoft Family Safety
  - Microsoft Outlook Hotmail Connector
  - Windows Photo Gallery
  - Windows Live Mail
  - Windows Live Writer
  - Windows Live Toolbar
  - Windows Live Mesh
- Windows Movie Maker
- Windows Photo Gallery
- Xbox Fitness

=== 2016 ===
- Microsoft InfoPath
- Microsoft WebMatrix
- Sunrise Calendar
- Tay
- Windows DVD Maker
- Windows Journal

=== 2015 ===
- Windows Media Center
- Windows Photo Viewer

=== 2014 ===
- Acompli
- Age of Empires Online
- Games for Windows – Live
- Microsoft Academic Search
- Microsoft Forefront
- Microsoft MapPoint
- Microsoft SideWinder

=== 2013 ===
- Microsoft Office PerformancePoint Server
- Microsoft Office Picture Manager
- Microsoft TechNet
- Microsoft XNA
- MSN TV
- Windows Home Server
- Windows Live Mesh
- Windows SideShow
- Zune Marketplace

=== 2012 ===
- Hohm
- Microsoft Expression Studio
- Microsoft Reader
- Microsoft Streets & Trips
- Microsoft Works
- MSN Messenger
- ProClarity
- Windows Desktop Gadgets
- Windows Live
- Zune software

=== 2011 ===
- Microsoft Kin
- Microsoft Money
- Windows CardSpace
- Windows Live Spaces
- Windows Virtual PC

=== 2010 ===
- Microsoft Expression Studio
- Windows MultiPoint Mouse

=== 2009 ===
- Encarta
- Microsoft Works

=== 2008 ===
- MSN Music
- Windows Messenger

=== 2003 ===
- Microsoft Picture It!

=== 1999 ===
- Microsoft Bookshelf

=== 1996 ===
- Microsoft GIF Animator

=== 1995 ===
- 3D Movie Maker
- Microsoft Write

== See also ==
- Microsoft and open source
- Microsoft hardware
- Outline of Microsoft
