= Sitecore Commerce Server =

- Developer(s): Sitecore
- Stable release: Sitecore Commerce Server 11.1 / October 2014
- Website: www.sitecore.net

Commerce Server was a software product for building multichannel e-commerce applications and systems using .NET Framework technology. The product has changed ownership and names several times. Previously known as Microsoft Commerce Server, it was at the end of the product lifecycle developed, sold, and supported by Sitecore for building multichannel e-commerce applications. It was replaced in 2021 with Sitecore Commerce Cloud. The latest release of the product was Sitecore Commerce Server 11.1, released in October 2014.

== Ownership History ==
The core software that formed the basis for the Commerce Server product line was developed by eShop and purchased by Microsoft in 1996. eShop’s technologies were integrated into Microsoft Merchant Server, which evolved into Microsoft Site Server in 1997,* and eventually to Microsoft Commerce Server in 2000.

In 2007 Microsoft outsourced product development of Commerce Server to Cactus Commerce, which was acquired in 2011 by Ascentium. Ascentium then bought outright the Commerce Server business from Microsoft that same year. In 2012 Ascentium re-branded its company as SMITH and split off the Commerce Server product division into a wholly owned subsidiary known as commerceserver.net.

Sitecore acquired commerceserver.net in late 2013 and released the product as Sitecore Commerce Server in 2014.

== Product Description and Components ==
Sitecore Commerce Server is a set of pre-packaged tools for building and deploying e-commerce websites and e-commerce software applications using .NET Framework technologies. It can be run on-premise or, with the additional support for Microsoft Azure and Amazon Web Services introduced in version 10.1, it can be run in the cloud. Version 11.1 of the Commerce Server codebase is the first built entirely in .NET Framework 4.5 and Visual C++ 2013, eliminating Visual Basic 6 and various Visual C++ runtime dependencies.

Sitecore Commerce Server has the following components:

- Core Systems:
  - Catalog
  - Inventory
  - Order Capture
  - Discounts
  - Profiles
- Integration Points:
  - Orders Web Service + BizTalk Adapter
  - Catalog and Inventory Web Service + BizTalk Adapter
  - Profiles Web Service + BizTalk Adapter
  - Marketing Web Service
- Desktop Business Tools:
  - Catalog Manager
  - Marketing Manager
  - Customer and Order Manager
- Commerce Server Staging
- Merchandising Manager (replacement of Catalog Manager)
- Sitecore Experience Platform Integration

== Related Technologies ==
Sitecore Commerce Server forms the technology foundation of and is included in Sitecore Commerce, Sitecore's primary commerce offering that also includes Sitecore Commerce Connect. It is marketed and sold as an optional, integrated module of the Sitecore Experience Platform, which also offers other modules for content management, multichannel customer experience management, and big data storage and management.

== Product Release History ==
- 1996 - Microsoft Merchant Server 1.0
- 1997 - Microsoft Site Server 2.0
- 1998 - Microsoft Site Server 3.0, Commerce Edition
- 2000 - Microsoft Commerce Server 2000
- 2002 - Microsoft Commerce Server 2002
  - Service Pack 2 (2003)
  - Service Pack 3 (2004)
- 2004 - Microsoft Commerce Server 2002 FP1
  - Service Pack 4 (2006)
- 2007 - Microsoft Commerce Server 2007
  - Service Pack 1 (2008)
  - Service Pack 2 (2008)
- 2009 - Microsoft Commerce Server 2009
- 2011 - Microsoft Commerce Server 2009 R2
- 2012 - Ascentium Commerce Server 10
- 2014 - Sitecore Commerce Server 11

== See also ==
- Microsoft Servers
- Microsoft Merchant Server
- Microsoft Site Server
- Microsoft Commerce Server
