= Brandigo China =

Marketing and communications agency based in Shanghai, China

- Type: Private
- Industry: Marketing
- Founded: Shanghai, People's Republic of China (2004)
- Founder: Mike Golden
- Headquarters: Shanghai, China
- Services: marketing communications
- Number of employees: 15
- Website: www.brandigochina.com

Brandigo China is registered in Shanghai, China, and provides brand strategy and marketing communications services in Greater China. Its head office is in Shanghai, China. The company, formerly Adsmith China, re-branded in 2017 to become Brandigo China. Brandigo China works across many industries, with a strong expertise in B2B marketing and communications. Brandigo is well known for own for bringing Costco to the China market, with multiple successful warehouse launches. B2B clients include Boeing, Maersk, Henkel, Grace Chemical, TP and Ecovadis.

Brandigo China is one of the few independent marketing and communication agencies in Shanghai. Brandigo China was founded by American Michael Golden in 2004. Golden is a graduate of Cornell University and holds an MBA from the UC Berkeley Haas School of Business. Brandigo China is the only China representative of AMIN Worldwide, a global marketing communications network of the world's top independent agencies.

The company started business in graphic design, branding and market research, and added the public relations unit in 2005. In 2008 Adsmith added the Interactive PR (digital) unit. Brandigo China developed the public relations business from 2005-2009. In 2014 the company developed content creation and inbound content marketing as core services, along with an internal communications consultancy. The company moved from its headquarters in InFactory to new offices in Anken Green in the Jing'an District of Shanghai in January 2010, and is currently located in downtown Shanghai. Golden was dubbed the "Branding King of Shanghai" by City Weekend Shanghai in 2010. The company works with many Shanghai-based partners. Brandigo is a member of the PRCA and abides by their professional conduct standards for communication agencies.

Golden has worked to promote general marketing and communication services in Shanghai through various activities, including a speech for the Australian Chamber of Commerce, and a book review in the peer-edited International Journal of Advertising. Brandigo China also publishes the CMOs Guide to China Marketing podcast. The agency designed and contributed to The China B2B Marketing Trends Report, both the first and second editions. Golden was featured in a Bloomberg article about controversial techniques used by Chinese influencers on Western social media platforms.

== Core Services ==
- Communications Consulting
- Content Creation
- Social Media Marketing
- PR/Media Relations
- Digital Experiences
- Influencer/KOL
- GEO (AI Search Optimization)
- Demand generation and brand awareness campaigns

== Associated Services ==
- Website Design & Video Direction
- Magazine Production
