= EShop (disambiguation) =

eShop Inc. was an American computer software company acquired by Microsoft in 1996

eShop or e-shop may also refer to:

- Nintendo eShop, an online marketplace for the Nintendo 3DS and Wii U
- e-shop, online shopping
