= Microsoft Office PerformancePoint Server =

Microsoft Office PerformancePoint Server is a business intelligence software product released in 2007 by Microsoft. The product was generally an integration of the acquisitions from ProClarity - the Planning Server and Monitoring Server - into Microsoft's SharePoint server product line. Although discontinued in 2009, the dashboard, scorecard, and analytics capabilities of PerformancePoint Server were incorporated into SharePoint 2010 and later versions.

PerformancePoint Server also provided a planning and budgeting component directly integrated with Excel.

== History ==
Microsoft offered preview releases of PerformancePoint Server starting in mid-2006. Previews of the product were formed from Business Scorecard Manager 2005 and the Planning Server component. Acquisitions ProClarity and Great Plains brought additional analytics and planning/reporting capabilities, as well as companion products ProClarity 6.3 and FRx.

PerformancePoint Server was officially released in November 2007.

Microsoft discontinued PerformancePoint Server as an independent product in 2009 and folded its dashboard, scorecard and analytics capabilities into PerformancePoint Services in SharePoint Server 2010.

== Monitoring Server Component ==
Business monitoring capabilities, including dashboards, scorecards & key performance indicators, navigable reports for deeper analysis, strategy maps, and linked filtering, are provided by PerformancePoint's Monitoring Server component. A Dashboard Designer application that is distributed from Monitoring Server enables business analysts or IT Administrators to:

- create & test data source connections
- create views that use those data connections
- assemble the views into a dashboard
- deploy the dashboard as a SharePoint page

Dashboard Designer saved content and security information back to the Monitoring Server. Data source connections, such as OLAP cubes or relational tables, were also made through Monitoring Server.

After a dashboard has been published to the Monitoring Server database, it would be deployed as a SharePoint page and shared with other users as such. When the pages were opened in a web browser, Monitoring Server updated the data in the views by connecting back to the original data sources.

== Planning Server Component ==
PerformancePoint's Planning Server component supported maintenance of logical business models, budget & approval workflows, enterprise data sources, and it followed Generally Accepted Accounting Principles.

Planning Server made use of Excel for input and line-of-business reporting, as well as SQL Server for storing and processing business models.

== Management Reporter Component ==
The Management Reporter component was designed to perform financial reporting and can read PerformancePoint Planning models directly. A development kit was also available to allow this component to read other models.
