= Kevin Calabro =

American sportscaster (born 1956)

- Born: Kevin Paul Calabro; June 27, 1956 (age 70)
- Occupation: Sportscaster
- Sports commentary career
- Genre: Play-by-play
- Sports: MLS; NBA

Kevin Paul Calabro (born June 27, 1956) is an American sportscaster. Calabro served as the television play-by-play voice for the Portland Trail Blazers from 2016 to 2026, following a twenty-two year career with the Seattle SuperSonics. He was the lead play-by-play announcer for NBA on ESPN Radio, including NBA Finals games in 2007, 2014 and 2016, alongside personalities such as Jack Ramsay and Hubie Brown. A diverse announcer, his career has spanned college football, college basketball, and MLS soccer.

== Career ==
Calabro is a 1974 graduate of Ben Davis High School in Indianapolis, Indiana. He called high school basketball games in Indiana on WBDG. He graduated from Butler University (1978) where he called Butler Bulldog basketball for four years. Calabro had stops in the Central Hockey League, where he broadcast games for the Indianapolis Checkers, as well as at Purdue University and University of Missouri where he called basketball games. He began his professional career as the play-by-play announcer for the Kansas City Kings in the 1983–84 season.

In the 1987–88 season, Calabro came on board with the SuperSonics alongside the SuperSonics original play-by-play announcer Bob Blackburn. He became the team's sole play-by-play announcer in 1992, following the retirement of Blackburn. Calabro reached a milestone 1,500 games in 2006. Calabro had an option with the SuperSonics for the 2008–09 season. However, on April 11, 2008, Calabro stated he would not continue with the team should they relocate to Oklahoma City, which they ultimately did.

Calabro was hired as the play-by-play voice for the Seattle Sounders FC, a Major League Soccer franchise, in its first year.

In 2016, he became the play-by-play voice for the Portland Trail Blazers, alongside former Oregon State University point guard Lamar Hurd, with whom Calabro had previously called Pac-12 games. He briefly stepped down following the 2020 COVID-19 pandemic, but rejoined the team in the 2021–22 season. In 2026, he left the Trail Blazers after nine-seasons after his contract expired.

The National Sportscasters and Sportswriters Association have named him "Sportscaster of the Year" for Oregon in 2018, as well as for Washington in 1997 and 2000 through 2007. He was also honored with the 2016 Keith Jackson Sports Media Excellence Award during the 81st Annual Sports Star of the Year Awards.

Calabro has done work on the national level with TNT, TBS, ESPN Radio, and NBA TV. He has also lent his voice to several Microsoft games, including NBA Inside Drive, NBA Full Court Press, and NFL Fever and more recently has been the play-by-play voice of the Sony PlayStation NBA game franchise. He called college basketball and football games for the Pac-12 Network, as well as postseason college basketball for Westwood One Sports, including NCAA tournament action.

Calabro's brother, David Calabro, is a sportscaster and the sports director with the NBC-affiliate station WTHR in Indianapolis, as well as the public address announcer at the Indianapolis Motor Speedway.

He will be calling select Minnesota Timberwolves games during the 2026-2027 NBA season. In his first year with the team, Calabro will share play-by-play duties with Jon Sciambi, Michael Grady, and Alan Horton.
