= National Broadband Task Force =

The National Broadband Task Force was an initiative of the Government of Canada whose mandate was established in 2001 by the Canadian Minister of Industry, at that time Brian Tobin.

The Task Force was chaired by David Lloyd Johnston, and its report was delivered on June 18, 2001.

== Mandate ==
The initiative sought "to map out a strategy for achieving the Government of Canada's goal of ensuring that broadband services are available to businesses and residents in every Canadian community by 2004."

== Recommendations ==
The Task Force recommended four overall "priorities" for achieving basic broadband access by 2004:

- Transport Link: "All communities should be linked to national broadband networks via a high-speed, high-capacity and scalable transport link."
- First Nation, Inuit, Rural and Remote Communities: "The priority of the broadband deployment strategy should be to link all First Nation, Inuit, rural and remote communities to national broadband networks".
- Public institutions: "The local broadband access infrastructure should be extended to the community's public facilities, including every public learning institution, public health care facility, public library and other designated public access points."
- Connecting Businesses and Residences: "The local broadband access infrastructure should also be extended to local business and residential users, for example, by leveraging broadband infrastructure serving public facilities."

== Membership ==
The membership of the National Broadband Task Force included web-linked members in Clarenville, Newfoundland and Labrador; Ottawa; Sioux Lookout, Ontario; and Iqaluit, Nunavut.

=== Chair ===
David Lloyd Johnston, president, University of Waterloo

=== Members ===
- Vic Allen, chief executive officer and vice-chair, Upper Canada Networks (UCNet)
- Louis Audet, president and chief executive officer, Cogeco Inc.
- Kathy Baldwin, superintendent, School District 14, 15 and 16, Miramichi, New Brunswick
- Brian Beaton, co-ordinator, K-Net Services, Keewaytinook Okimakanak in Sioux Lookout, Ontario
- Andrew Bjerring, president and chief executive officer, CANARIE Inc.
- Larry Boisvert, president and chief executive officer, Telesat Canada
- Pierre Bouchard, president and chief executive officer, RISQ Inc., Quebec Scientific Information Network
- Donald Ching, president and chief executive officer, SaskTel
- Hubert de Pesquidoux, president and chief executive officer, Alcatel Canada
- Denis Dionne, president, Montreal Technovision Inc.
- Darren Entwistle, president and chief executive officer, Telus
- Adamee Itorcheak, president, Nunanet Worldwide Communications
- John Kelly, principal, Reid Eddison Inc.
- Philippa Lawson, counsel, Public Interest Advocacy Centre
- William Linton, president and chief executive officer, Call-Net Enterprises Inc.
- Mary Macdonald, president, Macdonald and Associates Ltd.
- Michael MacMillan, chairman and chief executive officer, Alliance Atlantis Communications Inc.
- John McLennan, vice chairman and chief executive officer, AT&T Canada
- David Marshall, vice-chairman, Electronic Commerce, Technology and Operations, Canadian Imperial Bank of Commerce (CIBC)
- Gerry Miller, executive director, Information Services and Technology, University of Manitoba
- Wendy Newman, chief executive officer, Brantford Public Library
- Brendan Paddick, president, Regional Cablesystems Inc.
- Michael Sabia, president, BCE Inc. and vice chairman, Corporate, Bell Canada
- Jim Shaw, chief executive officer, Shaw Communications Inc.
- Gerri Sinclair, president and chief executive officer, NCompass Labs
- Charles Sirois, chairman and chief executive officer, Telesystem Ltd.
- Carol Stephenson, president and chief executive officer, Lucent Technologies Canada Corp.
- Allister Surette, president and chief executive officer, Collège de l'Acadie
- John Tory, president and chief executive officer, Rogers Cable Inc.
- Pamela Walsh, president, College of the North Atlantic
- Mamoru Watanabe, emeritus professor of medicine, University of Calgary
- John Wetmore, vice president, IBM.com, Americas
- Stephen Wetmore, president and chief executive officer, Aliant Inc.

=== Participating associations ===
- Canadian Association of Broadcasters
- Canadian Association of Internet Providers
- Canadian Cable Television Association
- Canadian School Board Association
- Canadian Wireless Telecommunications Association
- CATA Alliance
- Federation of Canadian Municipalities
- Information Technology Association of Canada
