= Sensibo =

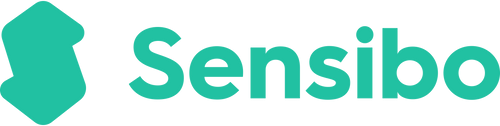
- Type: Private
- Industry: Home automation
- Founded: November 2013; 12 years ago
- Founders: Omer Enbar and Ran Roth
- Website: sensibo.com

Sensibo is a manufacturer of air conditioning controllers.

== History ==
Sensibo was founded in Tel Aviv, Israel, in November 2013 by Omer Enbar and Ran Roth. It largely operates out of Tel Aviv, Israel, where it has 17 employees, but like many Israeli tech companies is now headquartered in Redwood City, California, when it only has 8 employees.

The Sensibo product line primarily focuses on smart controllers that connect air conditioners and heat pumps to the internet.

The idea originated around 2004 when Omer Enbar had built a personal control system to activate his air conditioner via email prior to biking home from work. The system connected an IR blaster to a laptop that would send a signal to the AC every time he sent an email with the title "AC on" or "AC off".

During 2013, Omer Enbar and Ran Roth manually built and deployed several prototypes to friends and family. They later proceeded to found the company.

== Products and Services ==
The Sensibo controllers allow users to control their devices remotely through a mobile app, where they can set timers and use geofencing features. Additionally, Sensibo products integrate with other smart home systems and voice assistants.

Sensibo Sky: Connects to the user's air conditioner via infrared and allows for remote control through the Sensibo app and offers additional features such as climate react, which adjusts the air conditioner settings based on external weather conditions.

Sensibo Air: An advanced version of the Sensibo Sky, the Sensibo Air offers like room presence sensors and HomeKit integration.

Sensibo Air Pro: Builds on the Sensibo Air and adds an air quality sensor.

== Crowdfunding and video ==
In May 2014, Sensibo launched a crowdfunding campaign on Indiegogo. The campaign raised $165,000 on July 20, 2014. Its campaign video was later selected by Indiegogo as the funniest pitch video of 2014.

== Product launches ==
Sensibo delivered on its crowdfunding campaign during the summer of 2015, shipping thousands of units worldwide, according to the company. In May 2015, Sensibo launched an IFTTT channel, allowing its system to interface with other apps and devices. The devices are being distributed in many countries.

In January 2017, the company launched its 2nd-generation device, Sensibo Sky. Features include: 7-day scheduling, Location based on/off, Multiple users controlling a single device, integration with Amazon Echo and IFTTT.
