= Innofactor =

Finnish software provider

Innofactor Plc
- Type: Julkinen osakeyhtiö (Public company)
- Industry: Computer software
- Founded: Espoo 1983 (current business launched 2000)
- Founder: Risto Linturi; Sami Ensio
- Headquarters: Espoo, Finland
- Area served: Worldwide
- Key people: Sami Ensio (CEO)
- Revenue: 77,600,000 (2024)
- Operating income: ▼77.6 million euros (2024)
- Net income: ▼3.4 million € (2024)
- Number of employees: ▼571 (2024)
- Website: https://www.innofactor.com

Innofactor Plc is a Finnish software provider focused on Microsoft solutions in the Nordic Countries. Innofactor delivers to its customers IT projects as a system integrator and develops its own software products and services. The focus area in its own product development is Microsoft Azure based cloud solutions. Innofactor's customers include over 1,000 companies and government organizations in Finland, Denmark and elsewhere in Europe.

== History ==
Innofactor was founded in 1983. In its current form it has existed since January 1, 2000.

On December 3, 2010, Innofactor Ltd and Westend ICT Plc signed an agreement to merge as Innofactor Plc. Innofactor was registered in the Trade Register on January 5, 2011, and its stock symbol in the Helsinki Stock Exchange became IFA1V on January 7, 2011.

In June 2012 Innofactor signed a contract to acquire the entire share capital of Bridgeconsulting A/S from its management. Bridgeconsulting is a Danish IT services company focusing on producing business intelligence solutions based on Microsoft technology.

In November 2012 Innofactor acquired Project- and Project Portfolio Management Solutions Business from Tietotalo Infocenter.

In June 2013 Innofactor acquired the entire share capital of the Finnish company atBusiness Oy. Along with Innofactor, atBusiness is one of Finland's leading providers of Microsoft technology solutions to commercial and public sector clients.

In September 2013 Innofactor acquired Dynamic Team (company name Lainetar Oy, based in Tampere, Finland) and its business in order to strengthen its offering in the Microsoft Dynamics AX business area.

In December 2013 Innofactor signed a contract to acquire the entire share capital of Enabling Group.

In July 2024, Onni Bidco Oy made a public cash tender offer for the shares of Innofactor. Among the founders of Onni Bidco were, among others, CapMan Growth and Innofactor’s major owner Sami Ensio. As a result of the transaction, Innofactor was delisted from the stock exchange in April 2025.

== Organization ==
The headquarters is in Keilaniemi, Espoo. Other offices in Finland are located in Tampere, Turku, Kuopio, Kajaani, Lappeenranta, Jyväskylä and Oulu. Sweden office is located in Stockholm and Denmark office in Copenhagen. In Norway, there are offices in Oslo and Bergen.

As of January 2025, Innofactor restructured its operations into four main business units: Platforms, Solutions, Code, and Dynasty. Each of these areas has been incorporated as a separate legal entity under the Innofactor Group, led by its own managing director and responsible for specialized business operations and market focus across the Nordic region.

The Platforms unit provides cloud technology and infrastructure services. Its portfolio includes the design, implementation, and management of Microsoft Azure-based cloud platforms, data and analytics services, modern work and cybersecurity solutions, customers’ cloud migrations, and managed IT services.

The Solutions unit delivers industry-specific and cross-functional business applications built predominantly on Microsoft technologies. Its offerings encompass Smart Business and Smart City solutions, as well as customer relationship management (CRM), enterprise resource planning (ERP), and enterprise performance management (EPM) systems leveraging Microsoft Dynamics 365, Power Platform, and related business analytics technologies. Solutions targets clients in sectors such as manufacturing, finance, construction, and public administration, providing tailored digital transformation services.

The Code unit operates as the software development hub of Innofactor, specializing in custom application development, complex process digitalization, integration projects, and low-code development. The unit also works on research and product development initiatives to expand Innofactor’s technological capabilities.

The Dynasty unit focuses on information and knowledge management, providing products and services for document management, case and decision processing, and contract and quality management. The services of this unit are built around the proprietary Dynasty product family, widely used by public administration and municipal organizations in Finland and increasingly in other Nordic countries.
