= Power Query =

ETL tool developed by Microsoft

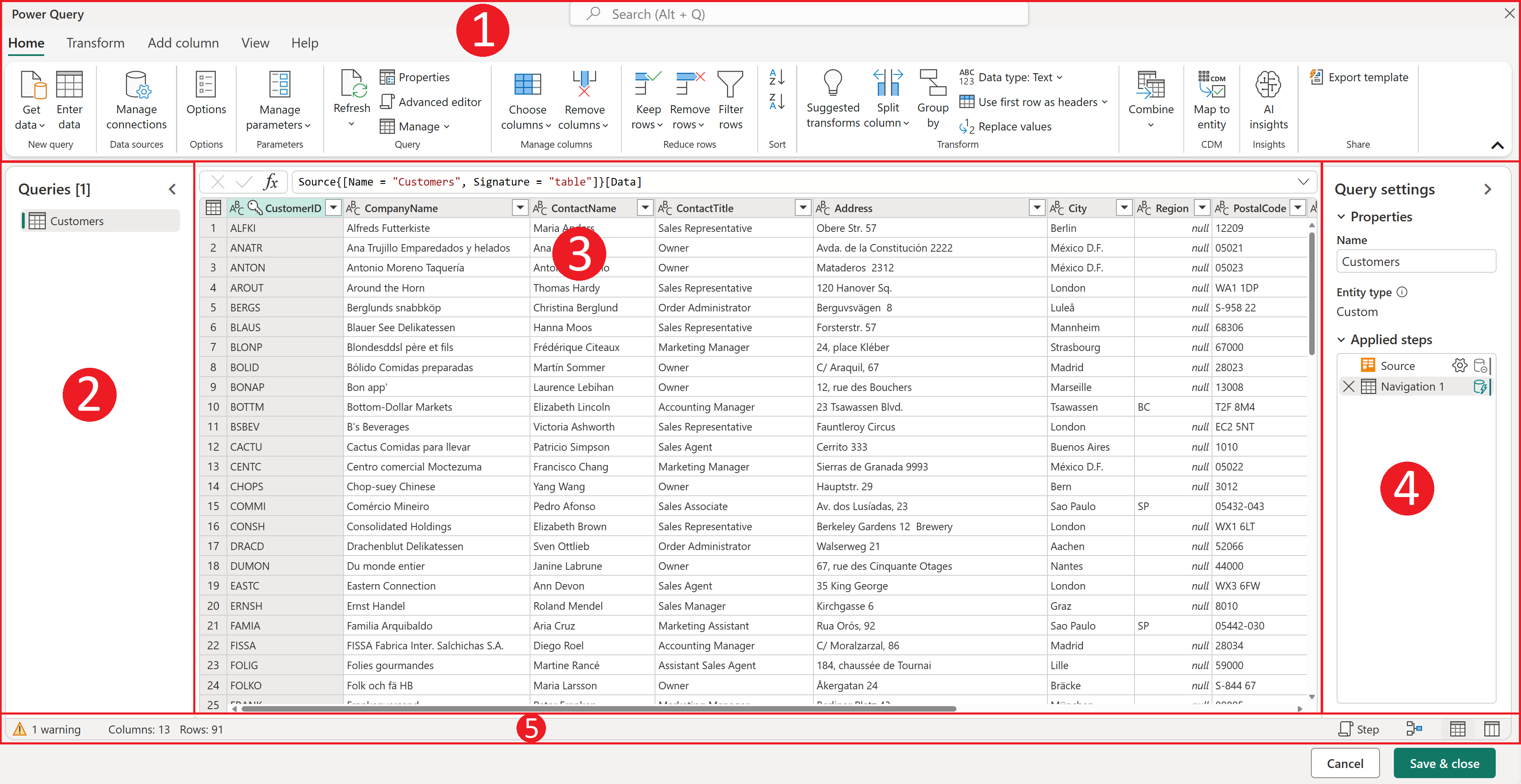
The Power Query user interface, as shown in the Power Query Online experience.

Power Query is an ETL tool created by Microsoft for data extraction, loading and transformation, and is used to retrieve data from sources, process it, and load them into one or more target systems. Power Query is available in several variations within the Microsoft Power Platform, and is used for business intelligence on fully or partially self-service platforms. It is found in software such as Excel, Power BI, Analysis Services, Dataverse, Power Apps, Azure Data Factory, SSIS, Dynamics 365, and in cloud services such as Microsoft Dataflows, including Power BI Dataflow used with the online Power BI Service or the somewhat more generic version of Microsoft Dataflow used with Power Automate.

ETL is closely related to data modeling, and for transformation, Power Query can be used to develop a logical data model in those cases where the data does not already have one, or where there is a need to further develop the data model.

== History ==
Power Query was first announced in 2011 under the codename "Data Explorer" as part of Azure SQL Labs. In 2013, in order to expand on the self-service business intelligence capabilities of Microsoft Excel, the project was redesigned to be packaged as an add-in Excel and was renamed "Data Explorer Preview for Excel", and was made available for Excel 2010 and Excel 2013. In July 2013 the add-in was removed from preview and renamed to "Power Query". Monthly updates for the add-in were released until 2016, when Power Query was included in Excel natively. In Excel 2016, the function was renamed "Get & Transform" for a short time, but has since been changed back to Power Query.

In April 2017, Power Query was made available in Microsoft Analysis Services. With the launch of the Common Data Service in March 2018, Power Query was included as its main data import tool.

== M formula language ==
Power Query is built on what was then a new query language called M. It is a mashup language (hence the letter M) designed to create queries that mix together data. It is similar to the F# programming language, and according to Microsoft it is a "mostly pure, higher-order, dynamically typed, partially lazy, functional language." The M language is case-sensitive.

Much of the user interaction with Power Query can be done via graphical user interfaces with wizards, and this can be used for many common or basic tasks. It is also possible to use the advanced editing mode where the developer can write in the M formula language; this gives greater expressive power, more possibilities, and can also be used to change the code generated by the graphical wizards.

=== Let expression ===
User queries are typically written with a top level let expression. The let expression contains a list of comma-separated named reference (variables) bindings and an in expression which is what the let expression evaluates to. The in expression can reference the variables and the variables can reference each other. Backwards and forward referencing is allowed, and self-referencing is allowed by prefixing the @ on the variable. Variables are recursively evaluated as needed to evaluate the in expression. No variable is evaluated more than once.

==== Examples ====
let
    a = "Hello",
    b = "World",
    result = a & " " & b
in
    result

let
    result = Fib(5),
    Fib = (iteration) =>
      if iteration = 0 or iteration = 1 then 
         1
      else
         let
            a = @Fib(iteration - 1),
            b = @Fib(iteration - 2)
         in
            a + b
in
    result

=== Assertions and datatypes ===
Variables are not typed in Power Query. Instead, an expression can have a type assertion which will evaluate to an error when the expression does not evaluate to a value compatible with the assertion. Assertions can be preceded by nullable to include null in the allowed values.

Datatypes/Assertions
Name	Description	Datatype	Assertion
number	Assertion for integer and floating-point numbers	No	Yes
int	Signed 32-bit integer	Yes	No
long	Signed 64-bit integer	Yes	No
double	IEEE 754 float	Yes	No
decimal	128-bit float. Same as C#'s decimal	Yes	No
time	Time of day	Yes	Yes
date	A calendar date ranging from 1 CE to 9999 CE in the Georgian Calendar	Yes	Yes
datetime	A composite of the date and time datatypes	Yes	Yes
duration	A measurement of elapsed time (can be negative)	Yes	Yes
logical	Represents a Boolean true or false value	Yes	Yes
text	A Unicode string	Yes	Yes
guid	A Globally Unique Identifier (Converts to a text as needed automatically)	Yes	No
list	An ordered list of values	Yes	Yes
record	An ordered map from text to any value	Yes	Yes
table	A 2D matrix where each column has a unique name and type (type not checked on table contents)	Yes	Yes
function	A power query function	Yes	Yes
type	Represents a datatype and may contain assertion information	Yes	Yes
action	An internally used datatype	Yes	Yes
null	The null singleton	Yes	Yes
any	Represents all values	No	Yes
anynonnull	Represents all values except null	No	Yes
none	Represents no values and always fails as an assertion	No	Yes
error	A pseudo value representing an error	No	No

=== Comments ===
Power Query supports the C block (/* ... */) and C line (// ...) comments.

=== DirectQuery ===
In Power BI, use of M-code is somewhat limited in DirectQuery, as opposed to Import which has all capabilities. This is due to the requirement that M-code in DirectQuery has to be translated from DAX into SQL and then into the data source's native query language (if it isn't SQL) upon user interaction with the data.

=== Query Folding ===
Query Folding is the ability for the Power Query steps to be transpiled into a single query at the data source (for example in Transact SQL). As such, Query Folding works like a traditional ETL process, and enables working on the data before loading. Query Folding is not always supported. Steps like filtering, selecting columns and simple SQL arithmetic are supported. Steps like creating index and appending or merging non foldable sources with foldable sources are not. Folding indicators (such as folding, not folding, might fold, opaque, unknown) might indicate up to which step a query might fold. Non-folding queries will have to be performed on the client-side. The order of queries can determine how many of the steps which get folded.

=== Connectors ===
A connector in power query is a library which enables queries to connect to a datasource. End users of Power BI can write custom connectors in the Power Query language. If a user is the owner/maintainer of the datasource technology they can request Microsoft certify their connector and include it in future releases of Power Bi after the review of the code. Connectors that are not certified can still be shared with other people who enable developer mode in Power Bi, or by Power Bi online domain administrators.

== See also ==
- Online analytical processing (OLAP)
- Data Analysis Expressions (DAX), a complementary expression language used to query models and compute advanced measures
- Logical data model, hereunder star schema with fact table and dimension tables
