= Karobes =

Karobes Limited was a leading British supplier of car accessories in the 1950s–1970s. The company was based in Leamington Spa in central England. In the 1950s it was the major seller of seat covers in the UK and had the reputation of selling luxury goods:

"Those seat-covers for instance, bright tartans, contrasting Bedford cords, or leopardskin, they all play a part in bringing gaiety to modern motoring."

Karobes was listed as UK trademark 670281 (14 June 1948, till 1997). Several items Karobes developed and successfully marketed like carpets, reclining seats or head and back rests were later adopted by car manufacturers and not sold separately. The company's catalogues in the early 1970s offered a wide range of products, from heel pads (for high-heels) to spotlight hoods, steering wheel gloves, vinyl roof kits and wiper attachments. One of the company's inventors, Leslie Morrison Keegan, filed several patents for head rests and seat covers in the late 1950s, for example

"A car cushion consists of three rectangular pads 5 each closely embraced by a common cover 6 double stitched at 6a to form alternate hinges between the pads so that they can abut end to end or be folded face to face."

Other inventors working at Karobes and filing patents were Barry Arnott, Leslie Morrison Keegan, Thomas Vincent Keegan and Gustav Donald Possart.

In the mid-1960s a seat cover made of "wool tartan backed with ocelot velvet" retailed at £7 17s. 6d.

In 1969 the U.S. legislation made head restraints compulsory in new cars, and the European automotive industry had to follow. In 1973 the British Automobile Association together with the British Standards Institution conducted tests of head rests, and Karobes' "X10" head restraint was one of the only three models which passed the test (less than 45° head rotation, 32 km/h).

Karobes was one of several car industry suppliers in Leamington Spa. Others of relevance were Lockheed (producing hydraulic brakes) and Automotive Products (automatic transmissions). In 1968, Karobes was acquired by Harmo Industries, in May 1988 by Beaverco, and in 1990 by Betterware.
