= M code =

M code or M-Code may refer to:

- Machine code
- MATLAB programming language
- M-code, GPS signals for use by the military
- M Code, used in conjunction with G-code in the CNC/machining industry
- M Formula language, sometimes called M code, a mashup query language used in Microsoft's Power Query
