= Microsoft Commerce Server =

Software product by Microsoft

- Developer(s): Microsoft
- Website: http://www.commerceserver.net

Microsoft Commerce Server is a Microsoft product for building e-commerce systems using Microsoft .NET technology.

== History ==
In 1996, Microsoft purchased the core software that formed the basis for the Commerce Server product line from e-Shop. e-Shop was co-founded by Pierre Omidyar, one of the founders of eBay.

In 1997, the software was rebranded to Microsoft Merchant Server, then Microsoft Site Server, eventually being renamed to Microsoft Commerce Server in 2000.

Initially released in 2000, Commerce Server replaced Microsoft Site Server, expanding on the functionality and establishing a focus on e-commerce functionality (rather than concerning itself with document management or content metadata). It helped to create an e-commerce solution or web site with high-performance, familiar tools designed to simplify setup, management, and administration tasks.

The last version of the Microsoft-developed product is Microsoft Commerce Server 2009 R2. Microsoft continued to honor extended support of Commerce Server 2009 through 2019. Sitecore now takes responsibility for developing, selling, and supporting the Commerce Server product. The latest release is Sitecore Commerce Server 11, released in 2014.

== History in the UK ==
Used extensively by a number of middle to large UK retailers, Commerce Server gained considerable traction in the early 2000s. Primarily implemented by Microsoft Partners, the following were sites that at one point were running on a Commerce Server foundation:

1990s:

- England Direct
- England Cricket Board
- Manchester United
- West Indies Cricket Board

2000 - 2010

- Alba
- Betterware
- Blackburn Rovers F.C.
- Blacks
- Blooming Marvellous
- Bravissomo
- Carl Lewis
- Cath Kidston
- Charles Tyrwhitt Shirts
- Choices
- Clarks
- Cross
- Dobbies
- Dreams
- Eyestorm
- French Connection
- GAME
- Graham and Green
- Great Plains
- Hawkin's Bazaar
- Hawkshead
- Lakeland
- Leicester FC
- Levi's
- Links of London
- Lipsy
- Liverpool FC
- LK Bennett
- Long Tall Sally
- MacCulloch & Wallis
- Maclaren Pushchairs
- Majestic
- MFI
- Millets
- New Look
- Newcastle FC
- Nicole Farhi
- Oddbins
- Ordnance Survey
- Oxfam
- Pearson Publishing
- Pets at Home
- Punch Taverns
- Racing Green
- Rangers FC
- Rohan
- Route One
- Scotts of Stow
- Soletraders
- St Andrews
- Suit Direct
- The White Company
- TM Lewin
- Toast
- Toys R Us

2010 - onwards

- Best Buy (UK)
- Co-op Electrical
- Co-op Pharmacy
- Exp Workwear
- WHSmith

=== UK Microsoft Commerce Server Implementors ===
The following companies were responsible for the vast majority of Microsoft Commerce led ecommerce implementation.

- Conchango - Conchango was bought by EMC in 2008 and rebranded in 2009 to become EMC Consulting
- e-in-business - The team behind eibDIGITAL moved over to Welcome Digital in 2014.
- Maginus
- Snowvalley - Snow Valley - now part of MICROS
- Screen Pages
- TCPL

== Components ==
=== System components ===
Commerce Server 2009, which became available on Microsoft's price list on 1 April 2009, introduced multichannel awareness into the product, a new default site (running in Microsoft's SharePoint product), including 30 new web parts and controls, and WYSIWYG (what-you-see-is-what-you-get) editing experiences for business people and site designers.

These features were introduced through the new Commerce Foundation - an abstraction layer that unifies calling patterns of the core systems (see below) and allows for different presentation and business logic to be easily added and represented as 'selling channels'; and SharePoint Commerce Services which includes integration with Microsoft SharePoint - a new default site with 30 new web parts and controls pre-assembled. The default site can be skinned through the new page templating technology, allowing for individual pages to be easily changed by selecting a different template.

The product still retains its core systems of Catalog, Inventory, Orders, Profiles, and Marketing.

=== Other components ===
The server comes bundled with Data Warehouse Analytics, which offer sophisticated reporting functionality, dependent on the availability of Microsoft SQL Server Analytics module, in addition to the Commerce Server Staging (CSS) system. The Staging functionality automates the deployment of both dynamic and active content across a network infrastructure and can accommodate a wide variety of network configurations. (Some have remarked that the speed of CSS deployments is perhaps the most note-worthy aspect of this component.) Commerce Server also comes with BizTalk adaptors, which allow for integration with Microsoft BizTalk for enterprise data manipulation.

== Related technologies ==
The product requires the presence of Microsoft SQL Server 2005 or later. Commerce Server also can leverage a number of other Microsoft server products, including BizTalk Server 2006, R2, or 2009 and Microsoft Office SharePoint Server (MOSS).

.NET Framework 3.5 and Microsoft's Component Object Model (COM) are also required, as the other components used by this product are dependent on these technologies. Recommended deployments are confined to Windows Server 2003 or higher.

== Microsoft release history ==
- 2000 - Commerce Server 2000
- 2002 - Commerce Server 2002
  - Service Pack 2 (2003)
  - Service Pack 3 (2004)
- 2004 - Commerce Server 2002 FP1
  - Service Pack 4 (2006)
- 2006 - Commerce Server 2007
  - Service Pack 1 (2007)
  - Service Pack 2 (2008)
- 2009 - Commerce Server 2009
- 2011 - Commerce Server 2009 R2
  - 2013 - Service Pack 1

== post-Microsoft Release History ==
- July 2012 - Ascentium Commerce Server 2009
- July 2012 - Ascentium Commerce Server 2009 R2
- December 2012 - CommerceServer.net Commerce Server 10.0
- May 2013 - CommerceServer.net Commerce Server 10.1
- May 2013 - Ascentium Commerce Server 2009 R2 Service Pack 1
- August 2014 - Sitecore Commerce Server 11.0
- October 2014 - Sitecore Commerce Server 11.1

== Future development ==
The Microsoft Commerce Server business was outsourced to Cactus Commerce (Gatineau, Quebec, Canada) in 2007. After Ascentium purchased Cactus Commerce along with the Microsoft Commerce Server business in 2011, they rebranded the software to Ascentium Commerce Server.

Ascentium later rebranded itself as SMITH and split off the Commerce Server product division into a subsidiary known as CommerceServer.net.

In November 2013, Sitecore acquired CommerceServer.net.

In August 2014, Sitecore released Sitecore Commerce Server 11.

== See also ==
- Microsoft Servers
- Sitecore Commerce Server
