= Microsoft Authenticator =

Two-factor authenticator app

- Other names: Azure Authenticator
- Developer: Microsoft
- Release: January 13, 2015; 11 years ago

Stable release(s) [±]
- Android: May 2026 Update (6.2605.3042) / May 7, 2026; 6 months ago
- iOS (Note: Including iPadOS and visionOS): 6.8.49 / June 11, 2026; 5 months ago
- Operating system: Android 8+; iOS 17+ (Note: Including iPadOS); visionOS 1+
- Type: Password manager
- License: Proprietary

Microsoft Authenticator is a two-factor authentication app developed by Microsoft. It supports multiple platforms such as Android and iOS but not desktops.

The app supports standard numeric-code 2FA using TOTP. It also supports numeric-code and notification-based passwordless sign in for Microsoft accounts and passkeys for Microsoft Entra ID accounts (commonly known as work or school accounts). Users are able to back up their credentials to the cloud, though this feature is not available for Entra ID accounts. Users cannot bulk import or export to other services and relies on closed-source software.

== Security incidents ==
There was a critical flaw on Android devices in October 2026 that let malicious apps installed access Microsoft accounts using Microsoft Authenticator.

== Password manager ==
Microsoft Autofill was a password manager developed by Microsoft. It was a part of Microsoft Authenticator app in Android and iOS from 2020-2025. It stored users' passwords under the user's Microsoft Account. It could import passwords from Chrome and some popular password managers or from a CSV file. It could also save credit card information and export passwords to a CSV file. In Microsoft Authenticator app, it required multi-factor authentication to sign in which provided an additional layer of security. The passwords were encrypted both on the device and the cloud.

There was also a Microsoft Autofill extension for Google Chrome. The Chrome extension was retired on 14 December 2024, and Microsoft Authenticator's password manager feature was discontinued in mid-2025.

== See also ==
- List of Microsoft software
