= Reflektion =

Digital search platform

- Founded: 2012
- Headquarters: San Mateo, California
- Founder: Amar Chokhawala
- Industry: E-Commerce, Predictive Analytics
- Parent: Sitecore
- Website: reflektion.com

Reflektion is a software company founded by former Google engineer Amar Chokhawala in 2012. Employing machine learning, the company has developed a next-generation personalization platform that raises conversion and revenue for leading digital retailers. The solution, referred to as Individualized Commerce, captures shopper preferences and behavior, and quickly responds to site visitors with the most individually relevant merchandise and site-search results. Chokhawala founded the company after an 11-year stint at Google, where he developed similar user modeling and semantic learning techniques for the AdSense, Gmail and Google Books platforms.

Notable clients using the Reflektion platform include The Walt Disney Company, Uniqlo, Gander Mountain, Godiva, and The Green Bay Packers. Published client results include Surfboard retailer O’Neill, which reported a 26% increase in conversion rate, 85% increase in user engagement, and 17% increase in average order size.

Based in San Mateo, California, Reflektion has gone through two major rounds of venture capital fundraising. The company has raised $29.3 million since 2012, with $18 Million in Series B Funding Led by Battery Ventures in February 2016 and $8 million of that coming in as Series A funding through Intel Capital and Nike in March, 2014. Reflektion was selected by a board of National Retail Federation judges as the final winner of the 2015 Shop.org Digital Startup of The Year award.

In September 2021, Reflektion was acquired by Sitecore.
