= Sitecore =

Digital experience company

- Type: Private
- Industry: Software
- Founded: 2001 in Denmark
- Headquarters: London, United Kingdom
- Key people: Eric Stine, CEO (May 2025)
- Products: SitecoreAI; SitecoreAI CMS; SitecoreAI DAM; Sitecore Experience Platform (XP); Sitecore Commerce
- Website: sitecore.com

Sitecore is a customer experience management company that provides web content management, and multichannel marketing automation software.

SitecoreAI™ is an artificial intelligence platform developed by Sitecore that integrates content management, customer data, and personalization capabilities within an enterprise software environment. The platform incorporates AI-driven tools intended to support content operations, customer engagement, and personalized digital experiences across marketing channels.

The company was founded in 2001 in Denmark.

== History ==
In 1998, in Copenhagen, Denmark, University of Copenhagen alumni Thomas Albert, Jakob Christensen, Peter Christensen, Ole Sas Thrane, and Michael Seifert founded Pentia A/S, a systems integration company that focused on implementing websites built on Microsoft technologies. At the time, building and managing websites required the expertise of a programmer or developer. Thrane and Christensen devised and patented a set of procedures for building and managing websites and turned their invention into a content management system product.

In 2001, Sitecore was spun off as a separate business entity that initially sold content management systems in the Danish market. However, the company has grown into a global provider of customer experience management software targeted primarily at corporate marketing departments and marketing service providers.

=== Acquisitions ===
Sitecore has grown via acquisition since 2011, with its latest acquisition being GEO startup Scrunch in June 2026.

- July 2011, Sitecore acquired the development team and intellectual property of Pectora, a provider of web publishing solutions for deep integration with print-based projects.
- November 2013: Sitecore acquired the assets of commerceserver.net from Smith (formerly Ascentium) and took responsibility and ownership for developing, marketing, and selling Sitecore Commerce Server, formerly a Microsoft product called Microsoft Commerce Server.
- July 2014, Sitecore acquired a majority stake in Komfo, a Danish social media marketing and community engagement application provider and introduced its social media marketing suite, Sitecore Social.
- October 2018: Sitecore announced the acquisition of Stylelabs, a marketing technologies software vendor, and stated its intent to incorporate Stylelabs' digital asset management, marketing resource management and product information management applications into its Experience Cloud; the acquisition was completed in November 2018.
- June 2019: Sitecore acquired Hedgehog, a digital consultancy.
- March 2021: Sitecore acquired Boxever and Four51. Boxever is a SaaS-based Customer Data Platform (CDP) that provides decisioning and experimentation. Four51 is a company delivering modern B2B and B2C experiences for enterprise brands.
- May 2021:Sitecore acquired Moosend. Moosend is a marketing automation platform.
- September 2021: Sitecore acquired Reflektion. Reflektion is an AI-powered digital search platform.
- June 2026: Sitecore acquired generative engine optimization platform Scrunch. In the announcement, Sitecore described Scrunch (also known as Scrunch AI) as "an AI customer experience platform that helps brands understand and improve how they appear in AI search."

=== Headless and Cloud Architecture ===
In July 2022, Sitecore introduced XM Cloud, a fully managed, cloud-hosted platform built on Sitecore's headless CMS and including a visual Pages editor for content authors. The release moved Sitecore's core content management and authoring capabilities to a modern cloud architecture and introduced support for a more composable technology stack. Published content can be delivered through Experience Edge, a Sitecore-hosted service that exposes content through a GraphQL API and distributes it through a content delivery network.

== Sitecore MVP Award ==
The Most Valuable Professional (MVP) Award is a recognition given by a number of technology organizations to individuals who have made outstanding contributions to their communities, particularly in the areas of technology, innovation, and sharing their inventing and experience. Inspired by Microsoft Most Valuable Professional award, Sitecore in 2006 introduced Sitecore Most Valuable Professional (MVP) Award. This award, running ever since, acknowledges professionals who actively contribute their knowledge and expertise to the Sitecore community, both online and offline. MVPs are selected from several thousands of certified developers and active community participants, making it a prestigious recognition within the Sitecore ecosystem. This program highlights individuals who have made a significant impact through their contributions and support for Sitecore products and their users.

Sitecore employees are not eligible for participation, mostly because of having an unfair inside knowledge advantage and a conflict of interests. There are no other constraints to the participants, as soon as they demonstrate excellence over 12 consequent months starting December 1st of each year.

Sitecore publishes an official press release each year after the award winners are announced, typically between the end of January and early February. All the award winners for the past years since 2008 are published at Sitecore MVP Directory that allows searching and filtering by various criteria, such as a category, country, year or direct search by a winner's name to see the years of award recognition and categories.

== Leadership ==
Michael Seifert was the company's CEO from its founding in 2001 until 2017. His method for collecting human experience analytics data was awarded US Patent 8,255,526 in August 2012. Eric Stine was appointed CEO of Sitecore in May 2025, after previously serving as COO.
