= Microsoft Site Server =

Defunct Microsoft web service platform

- Developer(s): Microsoft
- Website: www.microsoft.com/siteserver/

Microsoft Site Server, first released in 1996, is Microsoft's discontinued solution to the growing difficulty of managing complex websites which included multiple technologies, such as user management and authentication/authorization, content management, analysis, and indexing and search. Site Server 2.0, released in early 1997, incorporated electronic commerce technology from Microsoft Merchant Server, Microsoft's first effort at providing a solution to the growing business of Internet-based commerce (or e-commerce). During the course of its evolution (culminating with Site Server 3.0), Site Server expanded on Merchant Server's functionality by annexing content management tools; which would typically be involved, it was thought, in facilitating the management of Web-facing content. Consequently, Site Server became not only a solution for businesses wanting to sell products online, but companies who had corporate intranet servers hosting documents.

Although Site Server went through several iterations, the most widely discussed and perhaps widely adopted version was the last, Site Server 3.0, released in 1998.

The primary areas of Site Server 3.0 functionality included:

- Indexing and Search
- Content Management
- Product Management
- Order Processing
- Site Personalization
- Ad Server

== Product Legacy ==
For its time Site Server offered one very credible among a select few alternatives for such functionality - particularly on the Windows platform. At its release it generally came out to very positive reviews in technical journals, although compared to later products its management tools were on the arcane side. The content management functionality was adequate, but not particularly competitive with dedicated document management systems that were available at the time. On this front, Site Server's main advantage was its low cost. Another feature that might have been a source of confusion was the taxonomy management system. The tools used to maintain item metadata were very basic and required a degree of technical familiarity foreign to most business users.

On the plus side, once configured, Site Server Commerce Edition got very high ratings for management of conducting e-commerce. Management of products and orders was fairly sophisticated - a strength that would be extended in the technology that succeeded it: Microsoft Commerce Server.

== Related Technologies ==
Site Server required the presence of either the Windows NT 4.0 or Windows 2000 operating systems. It was also dependent on Microsoft SQL Server. The code came from many acquired companies including eshop and Interse.

== Future Development ==
Microsoft has discontinued production and support of Site Server. E-commerce functionality was moved into a new product called Microsoft Commerce Server. Document and content management features were mostly segregated into another product called Microsoft Content Management Server, which merged with SharePoint Server 2007 which today has two principle editions: Microsoft SharePoint Server 2019 and Microsoft SharePoint Online, part of the Office 365 services offering.

== Windows Versions ==
After the e-commerce technology was integrated, Site Server was sold in two editions: Standard, and Commerce. The Commerce Editions incorporated a hefty premium in their cost.

- 1996 Site Server 1.0
- 1997 Site Server 2.0
  - Site Server 2.0, Commerce Edition
- 1998 Site Server 3.0
  - Site Server 3.0, Commerce Edition
