= Gerri Sinclair =

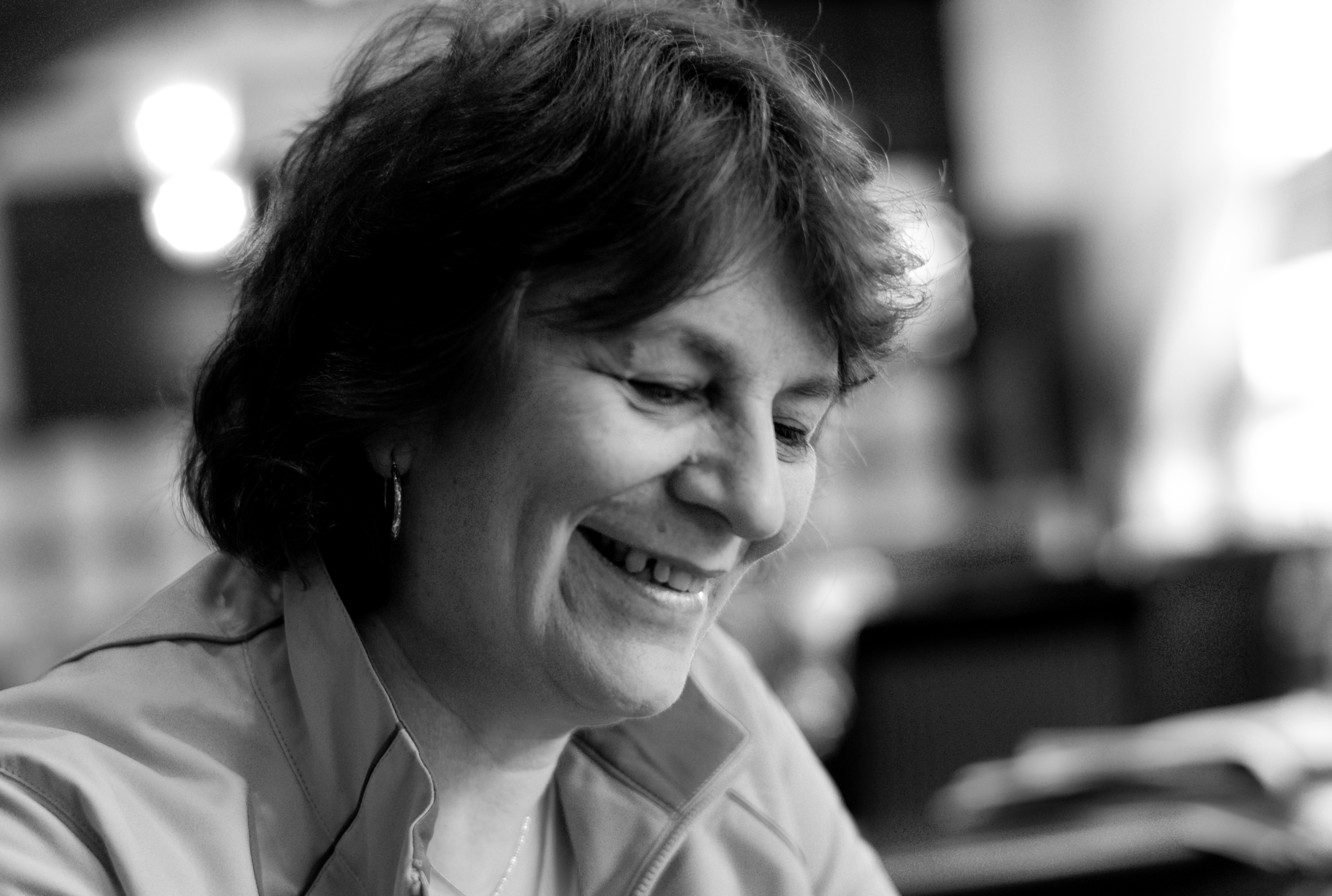
- Citizenship: Canadian
- Education: University of British Columbia (PhD)
- Occupations: Technology executive, entrepreneur, academic, government advisor
- Years active: c. 1980s–present
- Employer: Vancouver Airport Authority (2024–present)
- Organization: Vancouver Airport Authority
- Known for: Founder and CEO of NCompass Labs; Innovation Commissioner of British Columbia
- Notable work: Founding Director of the ExCITE Lab at Simon Fraser University
- Title: Interim Vice President, Information Technology and Chief Information Officer
- Board member of: TMX GroupInnovate BC (ex officio)Vancouver Airport Authority
- Awards: Bill Thompson Lifetime Achievement Award (2018)

Gerri Sinclair is a Canadian technology executive, entrepreneur and government advisor.

== Education ==
Sinclair holds a Ph.D. in Renaissance Drama as well as an honorary Doctor of Science in Computing Science from the University of British Columbia.

== Career ==
Sinclair was the founding Director of the ExCITE lab at Simon Fraser University, where she was an English professor. In 1996, she founded and served as CEO of NCompass Labs Inc, which was acquired by Microsoft in 2001. She was general manager for the MSN Canada subsidiary.

In 2016, Sinclair was appointed to managing director at Kensington Capital Partners and was the leader of the firm's Vancouver office, managing the $100 million BC Technology fund.

Sinclair served as the Innovation Commissioner for the Government of British Columbia from July 2020 until March 31, 2024. After concluding her term as Innovation Commissioner, Sinclair joined the Vancouver Airport Authority in April 2024, as Interim Vice President: Information Technology and Chief Information Officer (CIO).

== Board memberships ==
Sinclair has served on a number of Canadian national and provincial advisory boards, including the National Advisory Council on the Information Highway and the National Broadband Task Force. She was formerly President of the British Columbia Premier's Technology Council. She also served on the board of organizations such as Telus Corporation and BC Telecom, and has served as a director of the Toronto Stock Exchange, Canadian Foundation for Innovation, and the Canadian Communications Research Council. Additionally, she has served on the Social Sciences and Humanities Research Council of Canada.

== Awards ==
In 2005, Sinclair received Canadian Consumer Choice Award for Business Woman of the Year. She was also named on the 2016 and 2017 Vancouver Power 50 lists.

Additionally, BC Business Magazine named Sinclair as one of the 2017 Women of Influence. The next year, she received the BC Technology Industry Association’s Bill Thompson Lifetime Achievement Award, and a Lifetime Achievement Award as most Influential Woman in Business in Vancouver in 2020.

She has also received awards such as the YWCA Woman of Distinction award, the Canadian Women in Communications Woman of the Year award, and the Canadian Women in New Media Pioneer award.
