= Head restraint =

Automotive safety feature

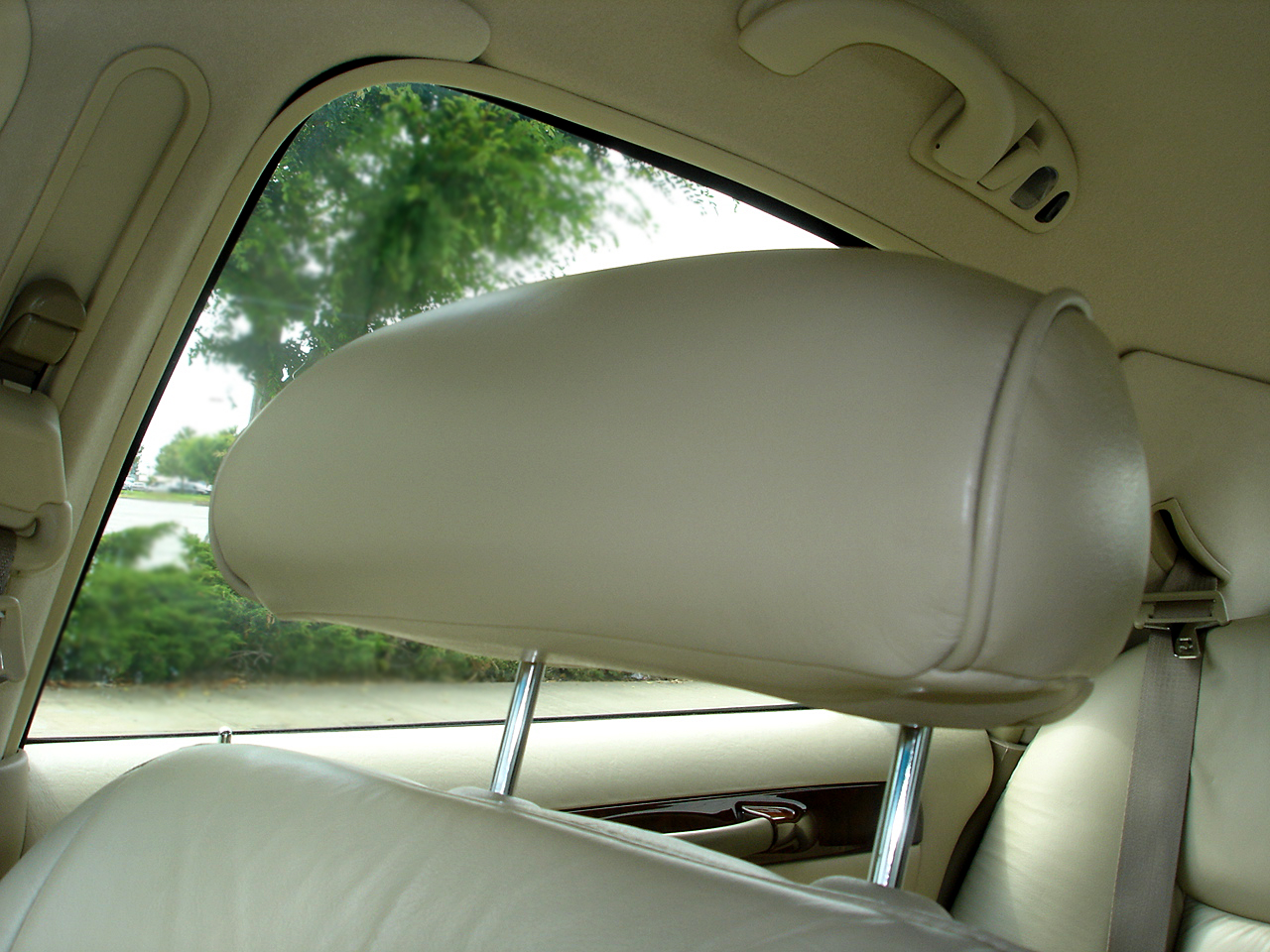
Head restraint in a Lincoln Town Car

Head restraints (also called headrests) are an automotive safety feature, attached or integrated into the top of each seat to limit the rearward movement of the adult occupant's head, relative to the torso, in a collision—to prevent or mitigate whiplash or injury to the cervical vertebrae. Since their mandatory introduction in some countries beginning in the late 1960s, head restraints have prevented or mitigated thousands of serious injuries.

A patent for an automobile "headrest" was granted to Benjamin Katz, a resident of Oakland, California, in 1921. Additional patents for such devices were issued in 1930 and in 1950, and subsequently. The major British supplier of head restraints, Karobes, filed patents in the late 1950s and was still competitive in 1973 when British tests evaluated the quality of these devices.

Optional head restraints began appearing on North American cars in the mid-1960s, and were mandated by the U.S. National Highway Traffic Safety Administration (NHTSA) in all new cars sold in the U.S. after January 1, 1969. The U.S. regulation, called Federal Motor Vehicle Safety Standard 202, requires that head restraints meet one of the following two standards of performance, design, and construction:

- During a forward acceleration of at least 8g on the seat supporting structure, the rearward angular displacement of the head reference line shall be limited to 45° from the torso reference line, or
- Head restraints must be at least 700 mm (27.6 in) above the seating reference point in their highest position and not deflect more than 100 mm (3.9 in) under a 372 N⋅m (3,292 in⋅lbf) moment. The lateral width of the head restraint, measured at a point either 65 mm (2.56 in) below the top of the head restraint or 635 mm (25.0 in) above the seating reference point must be not less than 254 mm (10.0 in) for use with bench seats and 171 mm (6.73 in) for use with individual seats. The head restraint must withstand an increasing rearward load until there is a failure of the seat or seat back, or until a load of 890 N (200 lbf) is applied.

An evaluation performed by NHTSA in 1982 on passenger cars found that "integral" head restraints—a seat back extending high enough to meet the 27.5 in (698.5 mm) height requirement—reduces injury by 17 percent, while adjustable head restraints, attached to the seat back by one or more sliding metal shafts, reduce injury by 10 percent. NHTSA has said this difference may be due to adjustable restraints being improperly positioned.

== Reason for discomfort ==
Headrests are uncomfortable when they push the head forward. In such case there is effectively no gap behind the head and the headrest, or more technically, there's a 'negative' backset (or gap) as the headrest interferes with their natural neutral posture. Data shows that 16% of the population will experience headrest discomfort because of this issue. The rest of the population experiences no discomfort because there is no contact with the headrest, i.e. there is a gap between the head and headrest.

Headrests are designed this way because the regulated specs for headrests are set for the 'average' body posture. When the U.S. National Highway Traffic Safety Administration (NHTSA) revised the standard which governs head restraints for all new cars manufactured after 2008, it established for the first time a requirement for the fore-aft position, or "backset". The backset requirements was set at a 55mm (2.1 in) gap behind the head of the "average" body posture. By definition, not everyone has the 'average' posture. The specs will therefore cause issues for this 16% subset of the population.

== Whiplash protection ==
The focus of preventive measures to date has been on the design of car seats, primarily through the introduction of head restraints, often called headrests. This approach is potentially problematic given the underlying assumption that purely mechanical factors cause whiplash injuries—an unproven theory. So far the injury reducing effects of head restraints appears to have been low, approximately 5–10%, because car seats have become stiffer in order to increase crashworthiness of cars in high-speed rear-end collisions which in turn could increase the risk of whiplash injury in low-speed rear impact collisions. Improvements in the geometry of car seats through better design and energy absorption could offer additional benefits. Active devices move the body in a crash in order to shift the loads on the car seat.

For the last 40 years, vehicle safety researchers have been designing and gathering information on the ability of head restraints to mitigate injuries resulting from rear-end collisions. As a result, different types of head restraints have been developed by various manufacturers to protect their occupants from whiplash. Below are definitions of different types of head restraints.

Head restraint: refers to a device designed to limit the rearward displacement of an adult occupant's head in relation to the torso in order to reduce the risk of injury to the cervical vertebrae in the event of a rear impact. The most effective head restraint must allow a backset motion of less than 60 mm to prevent the hyperextension of the neck during impact.

Integrated head restraint or fixed head restraint: refers to a head restraint formed by the upper part of the seat back, or a head restraint that is not height adjustable and cannot be detached from the seat or the vehicle structure except by the use of tools or following the partial or total removal of the seat furnishing”.

Adjustable head restraint: refers to a head restraint that is capable of being positioned to fit the morphology of the seated occupant. The device may permit horizontal displacement, known as tilt adjustment, and/or vertical displacement, known as height adjustment.

Active head restraint: refers to a device designed to automatically improve head restraint position and/or geometry during an impact.

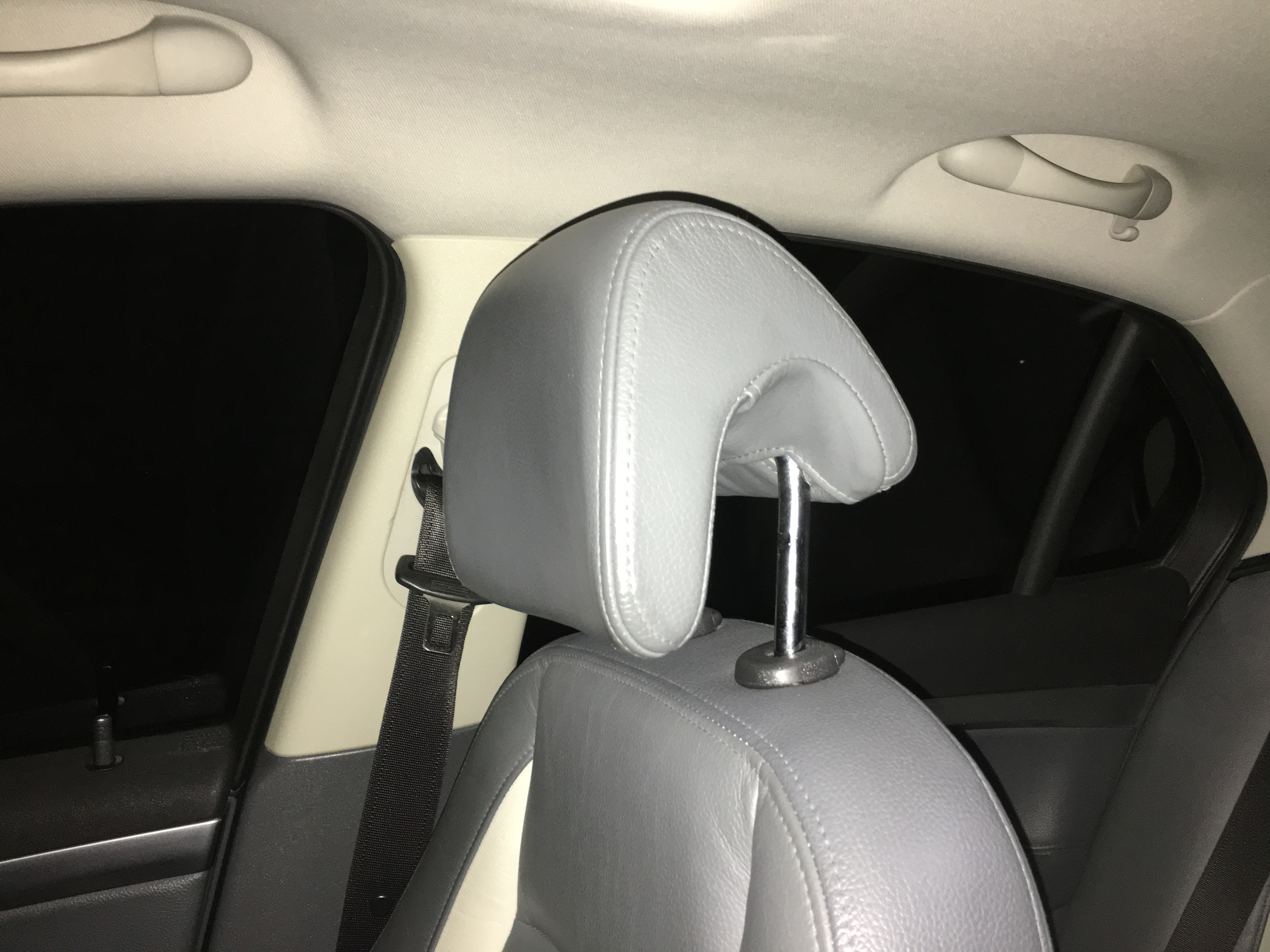
Saab Active Head Restraint

Automatically adjusting head restraint; refers to a head restraint that automatically adjusts the position of the head restraint when the seat position is adjusted.

A major issue in whiplash prevention is the lack of proper adjustment of the seat safety system by both drivers and passengers. Studies have shown that a well designed and adjusted head restraint could prevent potentially injurious head-neck kinematics in rear-end collisions by limiting the differential movement of the head and torso. The primary function of a head restraint is to minimize the relative rearward movement of the head and neck during rear impact. During a rear-end collision, the presence of an effective head restraint behind the occupant's head can limit the differential movement of the head and torso. A properly placed head restraint where one can sufficiently protect one's head lowers the chances of neck injury by up to 43% during a rear-end collision.

In contrast to a properly adjusted head restraint, research suggests that there may be an increased risk of neck injuries if the head restraint is incorrectly positioned. More studies by manufacturers and automobile safety organizations are currently undergoing to examine the best ways to reduce head and torso injuries during a rear-end impact with different geometries of the head restraint and seat-back systems.

In most passenger vehicles where manually adjustable head restraints are fitted, proper use requires sufficient knowledge and awareness by occupants. When driving, the height of the head restraint is critical in influencing injury risk. A restraint should be at least as high as the head's center of gravity, or about 9 centimeters (3.5 inches) below the top of the head. The backset, or distance behind the head, should be as small as possible. Backsets of more than 10 centimeters (about 4 inches) have been associated with increased symptoms of neck injury in crashes.

Due to low public awareness of the consequence of incorrect positioning of head restraints, some passenger vehicle manufactures have designed and implemented a range of devices into their models to protect their occupants.

Some current systems are:

- Mercedes-Benz A-Class Active Head Restraint (AHR), NECK-PRO
- Saab (Responsible for the first active head restraint), Opel, Ford, SEAT, Nissan, Subaru, Hyundai, and Peugeot—Active Head restraint (SAHR),
- Volvo and Jaguar: Whiplash Protection System/Whiplash Prevention System (WHIPS), and
- Toyota: Whiplash Injury Lessening (WIL).

The Insurance Institute for Highway Safety (IIHS) and other testing centers around the world have been involved in testing the effectiveness of head restraint and seat systems in laboratory conditions to assess their ability to prevent or mitigate whiplash injuries. They have found that over 60% of new motor vehicles on the market have “good” rated head restraints.

== See also ==
- HANS device
- List of auto parts
