= Greg Stein =

American computer scientist

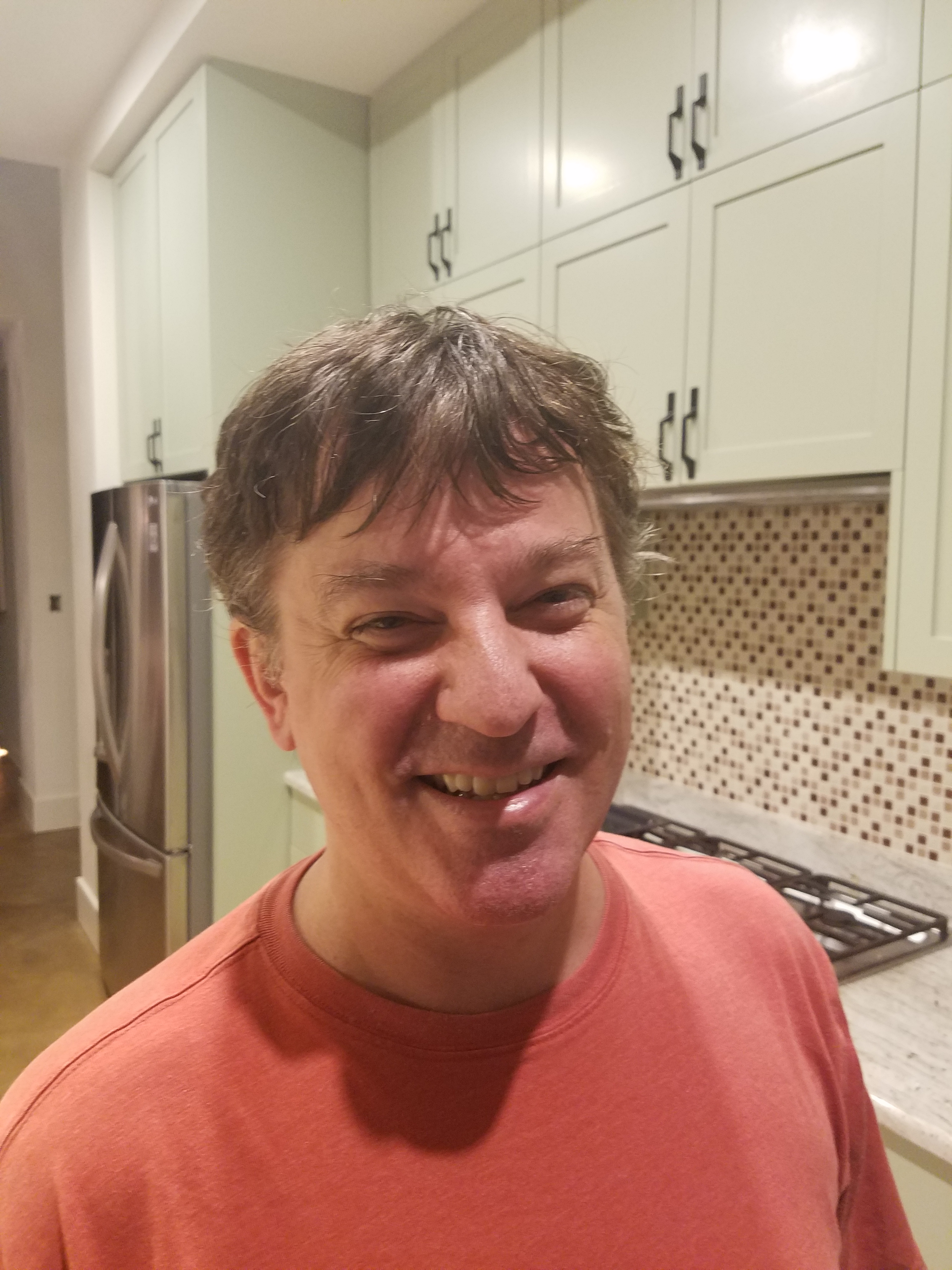
Stein at his Austin home; 2016-10-07

Greg Stein (born March 16, 1967, in Portland, Oregon), living in Austin, Texas, United States, is a programmer, speaker, sometime standards architect, and open-source software advocate, appearing frequently at conferences and in interviews on the topic of open-source software development and use.

He was a director of the Apache Software Foundation, and served as chairman from 21 August 2002 to 20 June 2007. He is also a member of the Python Software Foundation, was a director there from 2001 to 2002, and a maintainer of the Python programming language and libraries (active from 1999 to 2002).

Stein has been especially active in version control systems development. In the late 1990s and early 2000s, he helped develop the WebDAV HTTP versioning specification, and is the main author of mod_dav, the first open-source implementation of WebDAV. He was one of the founding developers of the Apache Subversion project, and is primarily responsible for Subversion's WebDav networking layer.

Stein most recently worked as an engineering manager at Google, where he helped launch Google's open-source hosting platform. Stein publicly announced his departure from Google via his blog on July 29, 2008. Prior to Google, he worked for Oracle Corporation, eShop, Microsoft, CollabNet, and as an independent developer.

Stein was a major contributor to the Lima Mudlib, a MUD server software framework. His MUD community pseudonym was "Deathblade".
