= NBA Full Court Press =

1996 video game

- Developer: Beam Software
- Publisher: Microsoft
- Platform: Windows
- Release: NA: September 20, 1996
- Genre: Sports
- Mode: Single-player

NBA Full Court Press is a video game published by Microsoft and developed by Australian company Beam Software for Windows in 1996. The game is one of the first to be published by Microsoft for its Windows 95 operating system.

== Gameplay ==
NBA Full Court Press is a simulation of five-a-side basketball matches, featuring four play modes: single game, season, playoffs and practice. The game is fully licensed and contains a roster of NBA players, with a coaching simulator allowing the player to manage rosters, strategies and plays across a full season. Online play includes modem and LAN support for up to four players.

== Reception ==
=== Sales ===
Beam Software reported to its shareholders that internal sales figures indicated NBA Full Court Press was one of the best-selling titles of 1996.

=== Critical reception ===
Reception

Review scores
Publication	Score
Computer Gaming World	3.5/5
Next Generation	2/5
PC Gamer (US)	60%
PC PowerPlay	82%

NBA Full Court Press received mixed reviews upon release. Positive reviews focused on the attention to detail of the game's coaching features and fluid pacing. Scott May of Computer Gaming World stated "coaching enthusiasts will definitely enjoy the arena of options", with an "impressive playbook selection, stat breakdowns and team management". Jere Lawrence of PC PowerPlay noted the game "plays extremely well" and has "excellent computer AI and well implemented offensive and defensive tactics."

Some reviews were less favorable, focusing on the simplicity of the game's overall presentation and comparisons to other basketball games. Next Generation made unfavorable comparisons to NBA Live 96, released earlier that year, remarking that the gameplay "simply isn't as precise, or even fun as other basketball titles". Gary Whitta of PC Gamer US focused on the "bland graphics" of the game, noting "the lack of a moving camera and in particular the look of the players themselves is underwhelming".
