= ProClarity =

Software company

ProClarity Corporation was a software company specializing in business intelligence and data analysis applications.

== History ==
The company was founded in 1995 as Knosys Inc. in Boise, Idaho. The company was renamed ProClarity after its primary commercial software product, "ProClarity", in 2001.

ProClarity's software products integrated tightly with Microsoft Analysis Services.

Among ProClarity's more than 2,000 global clients were AT&T, Ericsson, Hewlett-Packard, Home Depot, Pennzoil QuakerState, Reckitt Benckiser, Roche, Siemens, USDA, Verizon, and Wells Fargo.

On April 3, 2006, Microsoft announced the acquisition of ProClarity. The company was gradually folded into Microsoft's Business Division while a final update to the software product, version 6.3, was released in 2007. Additional business intelligence components, such as PerformancePoint Services for SharePoint 2010, and business intelligence improvements in Excel were released by the division in subsequent years.
