= Browstat =

Browstat Windows Command
- Written in: Command Prompt
- Operating system: Windows
- Platform: Command Prompt
- Website: https://windowscmd.com/browstat/

Browstat is a Microsoft utility for Windows that can monitor the browser service within a local area network (LAN). It can help diagnose a Microsoft network by listing machines and servers currently using the Browser Service, or by showing usage statistics.

The BROWSTAT.exe command-line tool is used to get a domain, browser, and PDC info.
