= Microsoft Loop =

Collaboration software

- Developer: Microsoft

Stable release(s) [±]
- Android: 1.2 (Build 429.21) / April 30, 2026; 5 months ago
- iOS (Note: Including iPadOS and visionOS): 2.110 / June 15, 2026; 3 months ago
- Operating system: Android 10+; iOS 18+ (Note: Including iPadOS); visionOS 2+; Web
- Type: Collaboration software
- Website: loop.cloud.microsoft

Microsoft Loop is an online collaborative workspace developed by Microsoft that offers a variety of features to help users gather, organize, and build notes, ideas, and projects.

== History ==
Loop was officially announced on 2 November 2021 as an addition to Microsoft 365 suite of apps.

== Functions ==
According to The Verge, Loop provides "blocks of collaborative text or content that can live independently and be copied, pasted, and shared freely."

Microsoft Loop comes with templates for meetings, project planning, and personal tasks, and offers integration with other Microsoft and third-party tools and services. It supports a maximum of 50 users editing a workspace simultaneously.

It uses shareable components that allow content from Loop to be turned into a real-time block of content that can be pasted into Teams, Outlook, Word and Whiteboard. It also features the ability to use Microsoft Copilot.
