= Tasker (application) =

Visual macro builder application for Android

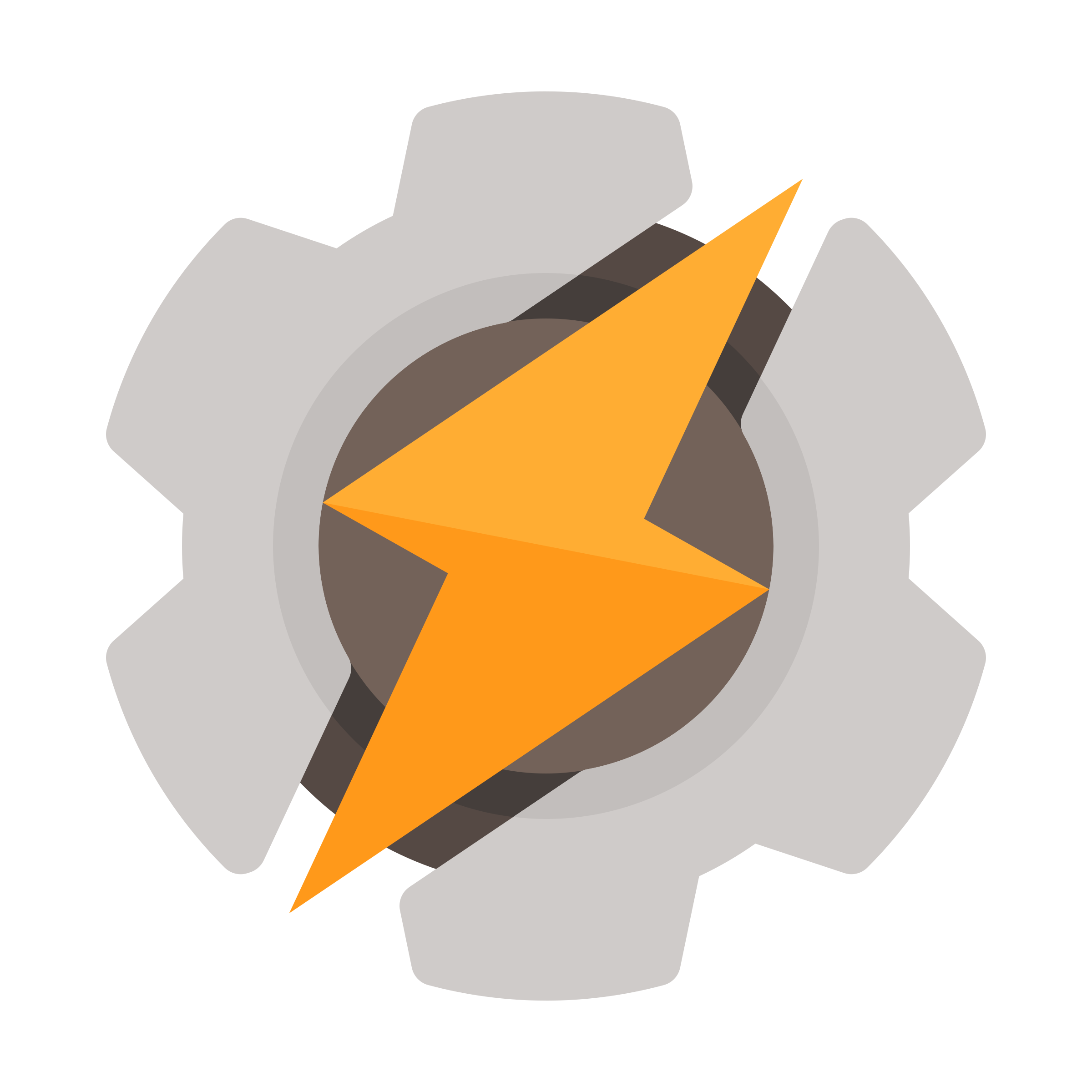

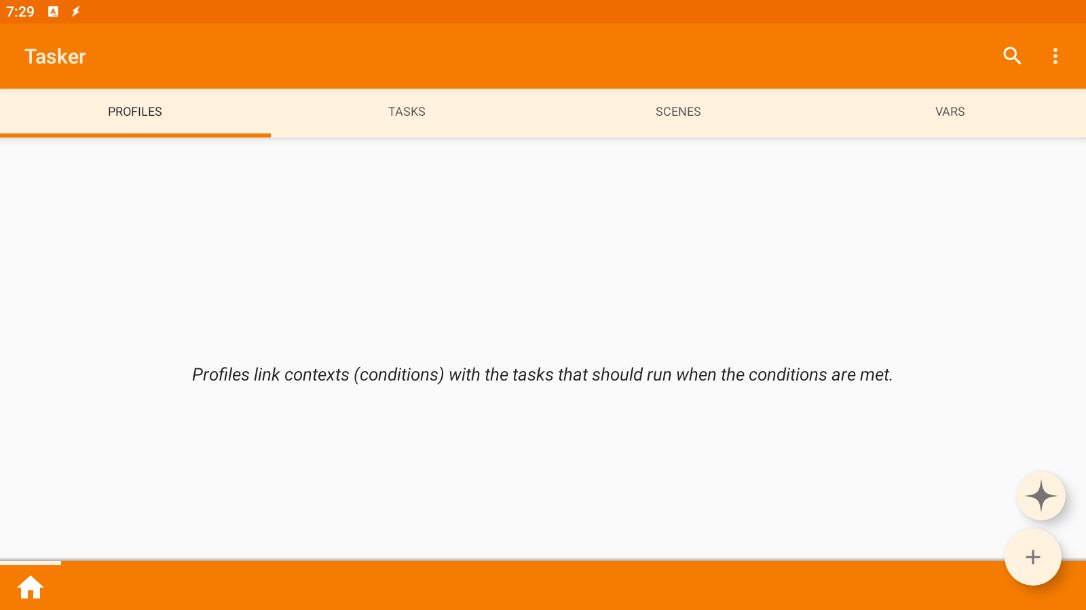
- Original author: Crafty Apps Ltd
- Developers: Kitxoo, Unipessoal Lda (João Dias)
- Release: 2010
- Stable release: 6.6.20 / February 25, 2026; 7 months ago
- Preview release: 6.7.0-beta / March 12, 2026; 7 months ago
- Operating system: Android
- Type: Automation, tools
- License: Proprietary trialware
- Website: tasker.joaoapps.com

Tasker is an Android application which enables performing user-defined actions based on contexts (application, time, date, location, event, state) in user-defined profiles, activated by click- or timer-based home screen widgets. It was originally developed by someone under the pseudonym "Pent", and later purchased by João Dias. It is expandable from third-party apps through the "Tasker/Locale" plugin interface, which was originally developed for the discontinued Locale automation app. Tasker is a paid, proprietary application for Android, with a seven-day free trial available on its official website. Recently with newer Android versions, some Tasker functions require helper apps, ADB or other workarounds.

== History ==
Tasker was inspired by Apt, a macro application developed by GlassWave in 2007 for devices running Palm OS. It is also created for the Android Developer Challenge 2, where the app came 3rd in the Productivity/Tools category. The app was released to the public in June 2010.

In November 2015, Tasker was removed from the Google Play Store for violating the Developer Program Policy regarding Dangerous Products for system interference. The issue appeared related to Doze and App Standby features, which were offered instead of a blanket permission to ignore battery optimizations. Google allows chat/voice apps to use the permission in Android to ignore the new battery optimization, features introduced with Doze Mode in Android 6.0 Marshmallow. The app was back in the Google Play Store as a "paid app" in 2016.

In May 2025, Tasker introduced a generative AI generator, allowing users to generate Tasker profiles, projects and tasks using select models on OpenRouter and Google Gemini. It can also generate widgets with its AI generator as well.

In February 2026, Tasker introduced BeanShell interpreter support, Shizuku integration for easier Android Debug Bridge usage, and support for sunrise and sunset times.

== TaskerNet ==
As of Tasker v5.5, tasks, profiles, and projects can be uploaded to TaskerNet and shared. The system, which is hosted on Tasker servers, acts as a file sharing system for Tasker files.

== See also ==
- MacroDroid, described as a simpler version of Tasker
