= MacroDroid =

Automation app for Android devices

MacroDroid is an automation app for Android. Jamie Higgins is the developer of MacroDroid, and the app supports Tasker plugins. The app has also been described as a simpler version of Tasker.

The app has been in development since at least 2012. In 2014, automation for Wear OS devices was introduced.

== Usage ==
The app works on both rooted devices and ordinary devices, though some functions will only work on a rooted device. It includes many pre-made macros.

== See also ==
- Tasker
