= Microsoft Dev Home =

Windows 11 development environment

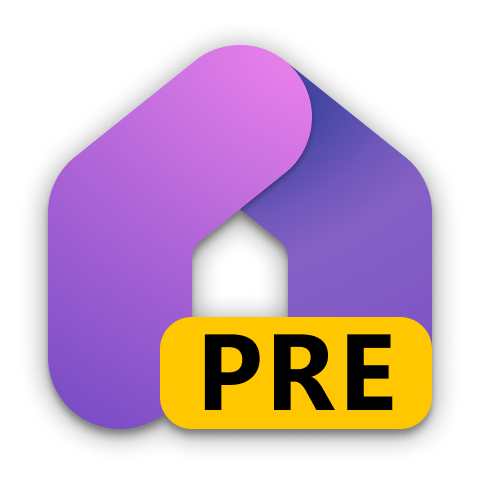
The icon for Microsoft Dev Home

Microsoft Dev Home was launched by Microsoft in May 2023 as a Windows 11 app to assist developers to streamline the setup process of a development environment. However, in January 2025, Microsoft announced that it will be deprecating Dev Home in May 2025.

== Development history ==
Microsoft based its development at GitHub.

It allowed the user to set up a "dev drive" using ReFS, set environment variables, change common developer-oriented settings such as showing file extensions in Windows Explorer, and install software using the Windows Package Manager (winget).

== See also ==
- Visual Studio
- Visual Studio Code
- Windows Subsystem for Linux (WSL)
- Windows Terminal
