= Generative engine optimization =

Digital marketing technique

Generative engine optimization (GEO), also known as answer engine optimization (AEO) and artificial intelligence optimization (AIO), is the practice of improving visibility in responses generated by generative artificial intelligence (AI) systems. The practice influences the way large language models (LLMs) retrieve, summarize, and present information in response to user queries.

This concept first appeared in response to generative AI technologies being integrated into mainstream search and information retrieval systems.

== Terminology ==
The term "generative engine optimization" was introduced in a 2023 paper by Pranjal Aggarwal and co-authors, later presented at the KDD 2024 conference. Several overlapping terms describe related practices, and usage varies across practitioners, vendors, and publications, with no consensus definition. Other terms for the same concept include answer engine optimization (AEO), large language model optimization (LLMO), artificial intelligence optimization (AIO), and AI SEO.

In 2026, Google published a guide to optimizing for its generative AI search features, which describes "AEO" and "GEO" as terms "you may see used" but argues that "optimizing for generative AI search is optimizing for the search experience, and thus still SEO." This position had previously been shared at conferences, with 2026 being the first time Google released official documentation stating it. Meanwhile, Microsoft Bing refers to the practice as "generative engine optimization" in its documentation, but does clarify that SEO fundamentals "support eligibility for AI-generated experiences." Microsoft Advertising uses both terms, defining AEO as optimizing for AI agents and assistants such as Copilot and GEO as optimizing for generative AI search environments. A Perplexity representative used "GEO" while cautioning against vendors overstating their expertise in it.

Tools and vendors are similarly divided. HubSpot uses the term AEO. Profound describes AEO and GEO as the same practice but argues that "GEO" can be confused with geography. Adobe's 2025 LLM Optimizer launch was covered as "AI search optimization," while its 2026 Adobe Brand Visibility product was marketed as a GEO platform; the Adobe platform Semrush markets its tools under "AI SEO" and "AI Visibility." Sitecore referred to the discipline as "answer engine optimization" and "AEO" in its press release announcing its acquisition of Scrunch. Peec AI describes itself as an "AI search analytics" tool.

Writing for Forrester Research, Nikhil Lai argued in 2025 that answer engine optimization (and related terms) are "significantly, but not fundamentally, different from SEO" and that advocates of terms like AEO, GEO, AIO, and LLMO "tend to exaggerate SEO and AEO's differences to carve a startup-sized hole in marketers' tech stacks." Venture capital firm Andreessen Horowitz used "GEO" in a 2025 essay on the field.

== Tools ==
Various tools are used to monitor how websites and brands are cited, referenced, or incorporated into responses produced by large language models. This includes free tools like the AI Performance report in Bing Webmaster Tools and Search Generative AI performance reports in Google Search Console.

While the efficacy of third-party tools is debated within the overall GEO and SEO industries, some of the largest tools used to track and improve generative engine optimization include legacy SEO tools like Ahrefs and Semrush, along with startups Profound and Scrunch.

== See also ==
- Information retrieval
- Retrieval-augmented generation
- Search engine optimization
