= Microsoft Graph =

API developer platform by Microsoft

- Original author: Microsoft Corporation
- Initial release: November 2015
- Predecessor: Office 365 Unified API
- Website: https://developer.microsoft.com/en-us/graph

Microsoft Graph is a Microsoft API developer platform that connects multiple services and devices.

Initially released in November 2015 as Office 365 Unified API, the Microsoft Graph builds on Microsoft 365 APIs and allows developers to integrate their services with Microsoft products, including Windows, Microsoft 365, and Azure. At its Build 2017 conference, Microsoft announced it would use Microsoft Graph to bring new functionality and connectivity between Windows and other OS platforms, including Android and iOS.
