= Visual Studio Lab Management =

Microsoft tool for virtual environments

Visual Studio Lab Management is a software development tool developed by Microsoft for software testers to create and manage virtual environments. Lab Management extends the existing Visual Studio Application Lifecycle Management platform to enable an integrated Hyper-V based test lab. Since Visual Studio 2012, it is already shipped as a part of it; and, can be set up after Azure DevOps and SCVMM are integrated.

== Virtual Environment ==
A virtual environment is a collection of virtual machines (VMs). Each Virtual Machine in a virtual environment represents a role required for the application that is to be tested, developed or run. Lab Management can be used to start all the virtual machines in a virtual environment to run an application, or test an application. Lab Management uses System Center Virtual Machine Manager (SCVMM) to allow access to virtual machines or templates in a library as golden masters. These golden masters are created by using either Hyper-V or SCVMM. SCVMM is used to deploy the virtual machines and templates in the environments on the specified host group.

== Using Lab Management for application lifecycle management ==
Visual Studio Lab Management is integrated with System Center Virtual Machine Manager (SCVMM) to enable management of multiple physical computers that host virtual machines and to manage the storage of virtual machines, virtual machine templates, and other configuration files in SCVMM library servers. It enables users to:

- Reproduce the exact conditions of a bug or other development issue
- Build, deploy, and test applications automatically in a clean environment
- Reduce the time required to create and configure machines for testing an application
- Run multiple copies of a test or development at the same time
- Create and manage virtual environments without requiring system administrator privileges
