= Microsoft Content Management Server =

Discontinued Microsoft server technology

Microsoft Content Management Server (MCMS) is a discontinued Microsoft product intended for small to medium enterprises that require content management functionality on their web site, intranet or portal.

== History ==
Microsoft Content Management Server was originally developed by a Canadian software company named NCompass Labs Inc. It was first marketed as ActiveEnterprise in 1997 and later changed its name to NCompass Resolution. In 2001 NCompass Labs was purchased by Microsoft for $36 million and the product was re-released under MCMS branding.

== MCMS 2002 ==
Some of the features offered by this product:

- Inline content-editing
- Built-in security model for authors, editors, moderators, template designers, channel managers, and administrators
- Integrates with Visual Studio, Visual Studio .NET 2003 and Visual Studio 2005
- Some out-of-the-box placeholders (which are essentially editable portions of a page)
- Support for multi-language content through parallel channel an connected posting
- Customizable workflow

== Discontinuation ==
The web content management capabilities of MCMS 2002 were integrated into Microsoft Office SharePoint Server 2007. New functionality such as enterprise content management, business intelligence, and search has also been included. Mainstream support ended 14 April 2009, and extended support ended 8 April 2014.

== Literature ==
- Building Websites with Microsoft Content Management Server
- Advanced Microsoft Content Management Server Development
- Enhancing Microsoft Content Management Server with ASP.NET
