= NCompass Labs =

NCompass Labs Inc. was a Vancouver-based software company that developed NCompass Resolution, a web content management software package. The company was acquired in 2001 by Microsoft for $36 million.

== History ==
NCompass Labs was founded by Gerri Sinclair, Kerem Karatal and Kristof Roomp in 1996, who were working at the ExCITE Center, a multimedia research group at Simon Fraser University.

The initial product of the company was a plug-in for hosting ActiveX controls in Netscape Navigator named ScriptActive, which was developed in cooperation with Microsoft. The company also developed a plug-in named DocActive, which hosted Microsoft Office documents in Netscape, which was licensed to Microsoft and shipped as part of the Microsoft Office 97 Document Viewer.

In 1997 the company changed direction releasing a Microsoft Windows-based content managed product named ActiveEnterprise. Later the name of the product was changed to NCompass Resolution.

In 2001 Microsoft purchased the company for approximately $36 million, and re-released NCompass Resolution branded as Microsoft Content Management Server in 2002.
