= EShop Inc. =

American computer software company

eShop Inc.
- Formerly: Ink Development Corporation (1991-1993)
- Industry: Internet, software, electronic commerce
- Founded: May 10, 1991; 35 years ago
- Founders: Arnold Blinn; Matt Kursh; Pierre Omidyar; Will Poole; Greg Stein
- Defunct: June 11, 1996; 30 years ago
- Fate: Acquired by Microsoft
- Successor: Microsoft
- Headquarters: San Mateo, California
- Divisions: eShop Plaza

eShop Inc. (formerly known as Ink Development Corporation) was an American computer software company founded on May 10, 1991. It was originally founded in San Mateo, California in 1991 to develop products for Go Corporation's PenPoint operating system. In later years, it developed software for the Windows for Pen Computing and Magic Cap platforms.

In 1993, it was renamed to eShop Inc. and developed electronic commerce software, focusing primarily on the "business-to-consumer" marketplace. eShop Inc. launched eShop Plaza on November 7, 1995, which included stores from online merchants.

eShop was acquired by Microsoft on June 11, 1996, for less than $50 million and eShop's technologies were integrated into Microsoft Merchant Server.
