= List of Microsoft video games =

Microsoft Gaming is a multinational video game and digital entertainment division of Microsoft. It creates video games for various platforms, including Microsoft Windows and the Xbox series of video game consoles.

== Lists of games produced ==
- List of Microsoft games: 1979–2000
- List of Xbox Game Studios video games
- List of Microsoft Gaming video games
- List of Bethesda Softworks video games
- List of Activision video games
- List of Blizzard Entertainment games
- List of games included with Windows
