= Microsoft Power Automate =

Task automation software

- Developer: Microsoft
- Release: November 2016; 9 years ago (as Microsoft Flow)

Stable release(s) [±]
- Windows: September 2026 Update (11.2609.183) / September 17, 2026; 12 days ago
- Microsoft Edge: 2.73 (Build 36) / September 27, 2026; 2 days ago
- Android (discontinued): 3.0.986 / August 31, 2026; 29 days ago
- iOS (discontinued): 3.0.986 / August 31, 2026; 29 days ago
- Operating system: Windows 10, 11
- Type: Task automation
- License: Proprietary software
- Website: www.microsoft.com/power-platform/products/power-automate

Microsoft Power Automate, previously known as Microsoft Flow until November 2019, is a SaaS platform by Microsoft for optimizing and automating workflows and business processes. It is part of the Microsoft Power Platform line of products, which include Power Apps and Power BI.

== History ==
On November 1, 2016, Microsoft Flow (now Microsoft Power Automate) became generally available. Similar to services like IFTTT and Zapier, users could connect between cloud apps and services with automated workflows known as flows.

On November 4, 2019, Microsoft announced a rebranding of Microsoft Flow to Microsoft Power Automate and its inclusion in Microsoft Power Platform with a shift from solely workflows to also include business processes. At the same time, a number of new functions were announced, including robotic process automation (RPA) capabilities.

In 2020, Microsoft acquired Softomotive, the makers of ProcessRobot and WinAutomation, to further expand the capabilities in Power Automate.

In 2022, Microsoft acquired Minit to further expand its process mining capabilities in Power Automate.

== Flows ==
Power Automate allows users to create automated workflows, called "flows", that connect multiple applications and services. Flows can be triggered via events, run on a schedule, or manually started. Common tasks performed by flows include data collection, notifications, emailing, and synchronization between services. Flows can be created using a graphical user interface without coding. Alternatively, they can be customized using advanced expressions and logic for complex automation.

=== Types of flows ===
- Automated flows: Triggered by events in connected applications, such as receiving an email or updating a record.
- Instant flows: Manually triggered by a user, often via a button in the Power Automate interface or mobile app.
- Scheduled flows: Run at predefined times or intervals to automate repetitive tasks.
- Business process flows: Guide users through a series of steps to ensure consistency in business processes.
- Desktop flows: Use robotic process automation (RPA) to automate tasks on local machines or virtual environments.

== See also ==
- UiPath
- IFTTT
- Zapier
- Microsoft Power Fx
