= Betterware =

British multi-level marketing company

Betterware Global Limited
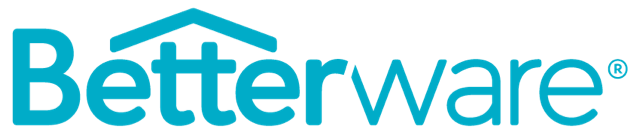
- Trade name: Betterware
- Type: Private limited company
- Industry: Multi-level marketing
- Founded: 1928 in East London
- Defunct: 2023
- Fate: Liquidated
- Headquarters: Ellesmere Port, England
- Area served: Worldwide
- Key people: Group Chief Executive - Rob Jones
- Products: Housewares
- Owner: Betterware Global Limited
- Number of employees: 2000 distributors
- Website: www.betterware.co.uk

Betterware was a United Kingdom-based multi-level marketing company that sells household products. The company was founded in 1928 and passed through several owners. The current owners of the Betterware trademarks are Betterware Global Ltd who purchased the trademarks after Betterware's owner Stanley House Distribution went into liquidation in 2018.

Betterware de México was founded in 1995 and has not been affiliated with Betterware in the UK or Betterware Global since 2001. It became a public company on March 12, 2020 (NASDAQ: BWMX), becoming the first Mexican company to list directly on the NASDAQ. It previously operated in Mexico and Guatemala until 2023. Betterware's subsequent owner, Betterware Global Limited, went into liquidation in April 2023.

== History ==
The company was founded in 1928 in East London and sold brushes door-to-door. It was originally called Betterwear and was renamed Betterware in 1970 to reflect a wider range of products. Stanley Cohen bought it in 1983 for £253,000 and moved it from Romford, Essex, to Castle Vale, Birmingham.

It became a public company in 1986, and was one of the best-performing shares on the stockmarket in the early 1990s when its share price rose from about 20p to more than 250p.

Cohen sold his share of the company in 1997, by which time it was valued at £117 million. Its product range included household products, kitchen and home storage products, personal care products, and mobility aids.

In 2015, it moved two miles within Birmingham, to Hurricane Park, Bromford. On 16 October 2015, the company was bought out by a Texas company CVSL Inc.

On 13 April 2018, it was announced that Betterware had gone into administration. Following the move into administration, a winding up petition was presented against the parent company Stanley House Distribution Ltd and the company went into liquidation in December 2018.

The only assets of Stanley House Distribution were the Betterware trademarks and these were acquired by a new company, Betterware Global, from the liquidators in November 2019. Betterware Global restarted the Betterware business based in Ellesmere Port, Cheshire, before it itself went into liquidation in April 2023 owing nearly £175,000 to creditors.

== Business model ==
There is a cost to join Betterware and replacement catalogues have to be purchased. Catalogues are delivered door-to-door in the United Kingdom and Ireland by a team of approximately 2,000 Distributors who then collect completed order forms. The products are distributed from the company's warehouse in Ellesmere Port. The sales force are all self-employed. Distributors submit orders online and the orders are delivered to the door by couriers. Covering a non-exclusive geographical area, Line Executives called Pioneers are responsible for a full down-line and they report directly to Headquarters. There are subsidiaries in Ireland.

It was a founder member of the UK Direct Selling Association.
