= Microsoft Whiteboard =

Microsoft Whiteboard software

- Developer: Microsoft
- Release: 2018; 8 years ago

Stable release(s) [±]
- Windows: 56.20201 (Build 588) / June 19, 2026; 4 months ago
- Android: 1.301 (Build 26042704) / May 5, 2026; 5 months ago
- iOS (Note: Including iPadOS): 25.11204 (Build 9201) / December 15, 2025; 10 months ago
- Operating system: Windows 10, 11; Android 8+; iOS 17+
- Type: Digital whiteboard
- Website: app.whiteboard.microsoft.com

Microsoft Whiteboard is a free multi-platform application, as well as an online service and a feature in Microsoft Teams, which simulates a virtual whiteboard and enables real-time collaboration between users. It was retired for personal Microsoft users on 16^{th} October 2026 whilst still being able to be used by enterprise, school, or work accounts.

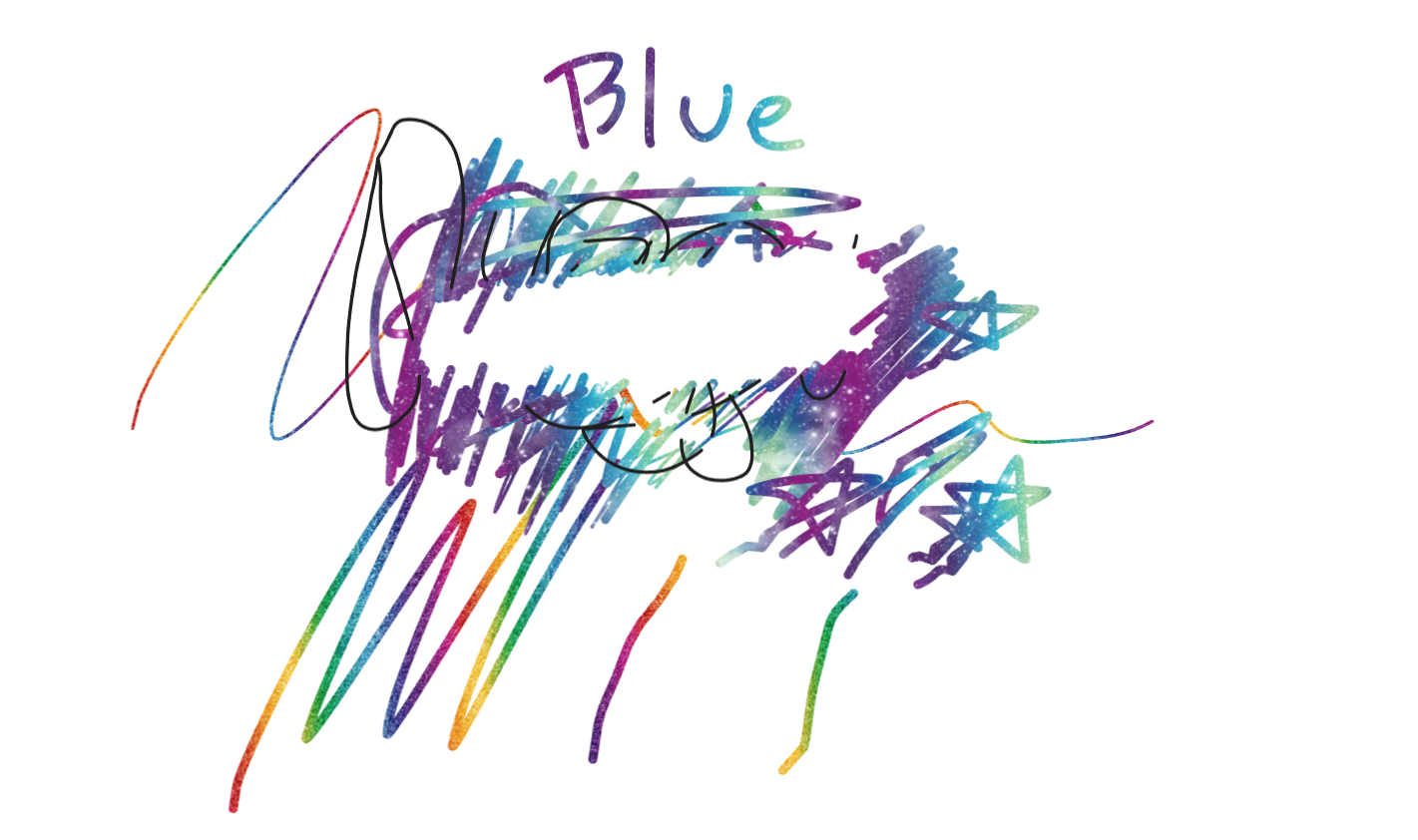
Scribble drawn on a whiteboard at a Microsoft store

== Overview and features ==
Microsoft Whiteboard allows users to draw on a virtual whiteboard using input methods such as a stylus pen or a mouse and keyboard, and write down notes, draw connections between shareable ideas, and interact in real time. Microsoft Whiteboard is available to download on the following platforms and devices:

- Microsoft Windows (on Windows 10 or above)
- Android
- Apple iOS
- Surface Hub devices

It is also available on the web and as a feature in Microsoft Teams.

Microsoft Whiteboard allows users with Microsoft accounts to view, edit, and share whiteboards using the provided tools and options. The feature set includes tools for drawing, shapes, and media. Drawing in Microsoft Whiteboard is called inking. It works both on mobile devices and computers. The inking toolbar has customizable pencils, a ruler, a highlighter, an eraser, and an object selector. Whiteboard can recognize shapes drawn by hand and straighten them. Holding the Shift key on a computer while inking draws straight lines.

Microsoft Whiteboard has keyboard shortcuts for some functions.

Switch to drawing	Alt+W or Alt+W+1
Pen 2	Alt+W+2
Pen 3	Alt+W+3
Highlighter	Alt+H
Erase	Alt+X
Arrow mode	Alt+A
Double arrow	Alt+⇧ Shift+A
Beautify	Alt+B

Additional features include inserting sticky notes, text boxes, stickers, as well as images. Grid lines and colors are adjustable. Different templates can be inserted into the whiteboard. Users can also share their reactions. A feature limited to boards created in Microsoft Teams, is the ability to make them read-only; other participants from the meeting cannot edit them.

== Reviews ==
PC Magazine gave Microsoft Whiteboard a score of 3.5 out of 5, praising the app's free availability and plentiful templates. It compared it to other, paid whiteboarding solutions, and concluded that Microsoft offers the best free one. Some of the cons, described by PCMag, include the inability to view boards without a Microsoft account and the inability to create custom templates.

== See also ==
- Whiteboarding
