= Smith (advertising agency) =

Seattle advertising agency

Coordinates: 47.617808°N 122.200545°W

SMITH
- Formerly: Ascentium (until 2012)
- Industry: Advertising
- Founders: Jim Beebe; Steven Salta; Curt Doolittle
- Headquarters: Seattle, Washington, United States
- Revenue: Approx. US$40 million (2012)
- Number of employees: 300 (2012)
- Website: smith.co

SMITH, formerly called Ascentium, is an advertising agency with headquarters in Seattle. As of November 2012 Smith employs over 300 people in Seattle, Portland, Spokane, Atlanta, Ottawa-Gatineau and Toronto. In 2012, the company was rebranded as "Smith" and relocated its headquarters to Seattle.

SMITH's clients include Microsoft, Cisco, Motorola, Nestle, Sam's Club, Xerox and MasterCard.

== History ==
The company was founded in Seattle by Jim Beebe, Steven Salta, and Curt Doolittle. They acquired one of the small Seattle internet-boom shops (Kindred Communications) in June 2001. In 2006 the company took a minor investment from regional fund Westriver Capital to cover acquisition costs and expansion. One of the acquisitions was a customer relationship management business, which the company then sold to Accenture in 2010, which according to the company website, was due to further emphasis and investment in the Digital Agency business. In September 2011, Ascentium purchased Cactus Commerce Inc., an internet commerce technical company based in Gatineau, Canada.

In 2012, the company had revenues of approximately $40 million.

== Agency model ==
The company operates using a mixture of traditional agency account management and technology services project management. It serves fortune 250 clients with complex value propositions that cannot easily be communicated by traditional media. The company promotes itself as experts in customer experiences, which the company's website describes as "making every interaction that a consumer has with a brand both engaging and fulfilling the brand's promise."

== Awards and industry recognition ==
Recent award recognitions include: 2013 Communicator Awards of Excellence, Gold Statuettes (x5) for their work on: Microsoft Windows 8 PC Selector (interactive multimedia - direct marketing; Xerox ColorQube Launch Video (film/video -use of graphics and use of visual effects); Top Golf (brand refresh (corporate identity - photography and identity manual/style guide)

2013 Communicator Awards of Distinction, Silver Statuettes (x5) for their work on: Microsoft Windows 8 PC Selector (online communicator advertising and marketing - rich media B2C); Xerox ColorQube launch video (film/video - art direction); Top Golf brand refresh (corporate identity - design); Itron campaign (online advertising and marketing - rich media B2B); Amtrak for android (mobile apps - travel)

Multiple Web awards from Adobe Showcase, Interactive Media Awards, W3 and the Webby Awards.

Recognitions for SMITH's earlier work and growth include being noted as an Inc. 500 Company in 2005, 2006 and 2007; being recognized as the 30th fastest growing company in Washington State in 2007, and noted as one of the 65 best places to work in Washington State in 2007, according to the Puget Sound Business Journal.

2009 Advertising Age ranked the company the fourth largest independent digital agency. 2009 Forrester ranks the company as the agency with the highest customer satisfaction in the industry. 2008 Advertising Age Top 50 Digital Agencies ranked the company as the 27th largest digital agency
