= Microsoft Power Platform =

Family of business software products

- Developer: Microsoft
- Initial release: 2018; 8 years ago
- Operating system: Microsoft Windows
- Type: Business intelligence, app development, app connectivity, robotic process automation
- License: Proprietary software
- Website: microsoft.com/power-platform/

Microsoft Power Platform is a collection of low-code development tools that allows users to build custom business applications, automate workflows, and analyze data. It also offers integration with GitHub, Microsoft Azure, Microsoft Dynamics 365, and Microsoft Teams, amongst other Microsoft and third-party applications.

Microsoft Power Platform enables users to streamline processes, gain insights from their data, and build custom solutions to meet their business needs. It is designed to be accessible to users with varying levels of technical expertise, making it easier for organizations to create custom applications and automate workflows.

Microsoft developed the Power Fx low-code programming language for expressing logic across the Power Platform.

== Products ==
The Power Platform family of products includes:

- Power BI, a business analytics tool for visualizing data through various charts, graphs, and dashboards. It competes with tools like Tableau, Spotfire or Qlikview.
- Power Apps for low code custom business applications.
- Power Automate (formerly Microsoft Flow) for business process automation and optimization.
- Copilot Studio (formerly Power Virtual Agents) provides tools for customizing or building copilot, or AI-powered chatbot, experiences.
- Power Pages, graphical software for making low-code websites. Formerly part of Power Apps as "Power Apps Portals" until 2022

=== Microsoft Dataverse ===
Microsoft Dataverse, formerly known as Microsoft Common Data Service until November 2020, is a relational database engine offered by Microsoft as a cloud-based data management software as a service for storing business data. Dataverse is a data storage and management engine serving as a foundation for Microsoft’s Power Platform, Office 365 and Dynamics 365 apps. It decouples the data from the application, allowing an administrator to analyze and report on data in a centralized manner. It is based on Common Data Model principles and includes security features and productivity tools. Data could be imported, managed and exported out of Dataverse. Dataverse is built on Microsoft Azure. It is mainly a tool for managing and storing data, and allows for creation and management of datasets through a single user interface.

Dataverse is marketed for use with other Microsoft products such as Power Apps and Microsoft Dynamics 365 applications, and has data connectors to other Microsoft products like Azure Event Hub, Azure Service Bus, Microsoft SQL and Azure Data Lake. One example of use could be to use Dataverse as a form of data lake together with Microsoft Power Apps. Microsoft Dataverse is also offered as a standalone service for businesses looking to build custom data solutions with integration to external systems via webhooks. Dataverse has APIs so that the data can be consumed by other services, like for example Power Platform services like Power BI or Power Apps, or by custom services designed in for example Visual Studio.

In addition to relational data, Dataverse also has support for file and blob storage, data lakes and semi-structured data. Dataverse is based on Microsoft's Common Data Model as its common data model and is built on Microsoft Azure SQL, where its physical data also is stored.

Dataverse has the possibility to apply business logic like duplicate detection, calculated fields, rollup fields and business rules. It can be used to discover, validate and report data, and has the possibility to use Microsoft's proprietary common data model. Access in MS Dataverse is handled with Microsoft Entra ID which has conditional access and multifactor authentication (MFA), and offers individual column and row-level security.

== See also ==
- List of Microsoft software
- Microsoft Office
