= List of richest American politicians =

This list of richest American politicians includes current and former office-holders and political appointees, and is not necessarily adjusted for inflation. Estimated wealth is at least $100 million in 2012 dollars, for all the people listed here. The amounts listed here do not necessarily pertain to the politicians' time in office (i.e. some of them may have gotten much richer later on, or lost their money before they ran for office).

== Presidents ==
Name	Party	Date(s)	Estimated wealth adjusted for inflation	Source of wealth
Donald Trump	Republican	2017–2021 2025-present	$6.3 billion (2026)	Inheritance, business, real estate, television
George Washington	Independent	1789–1797	$525 million (2010)	Inheritance, business, marriage
Thomas Jefferson	Democratic-Republican	1801–1809	$212 million (2010)	Inheritance, business
Theodore Roosevelt	Republican	1901–1909	$125 million (2010)	Inheritance
John F. Kennedy	Democratic	1961–1963	$124 million (2007)	Inheritance
Andrew Jackson	Democratic	1829–1837	$119 million (2010)	Marriage, business, real estate
James Madison	Democratic-Republican	1809–1817	$101 million (2010)	Inheritance, business

== Unsuccessful presidential candidates ==
Name	Party	Position	Estimated wealth not adjusted for inflation	Notes
Michael Bloomberg	Democratic (before 2001, 2018–present); Independent (2007–2018); Republican (2001–2007)	Mayor of New York City (2002–2013); Candidate for U.S. President (2020)	$106 billion	Founder and CEO of Bloomberg L.P.
Ross Perot	Independent (before 1995); Reform (1995–2000); Republican (2000–2019)	Member of the President's Intelligence Advisory Board (1981–85); Member of the Select Committee on Public Education (1983); Candidate for U.S. President (1992, 1996)	$4.1 billion	Founded Electronic Data Systems and Perot Systems
Vivek Ramaswamy	Republican	Candidate for U.S. President (2024); Candidate for Governor of Ohio (2026)	$3.5 billion	Founder and CEO of Roivant Sciences and Strive Asset Management
Tom Steyer	Democratic	Candidate for U.S. President (2020); Candidate for Governor of California (2026)	$2 billion	Founder of Farallon Capital
Henry Ford	Republican (before 1918); Democratic (after 1918)	Candidate for U.S. President (1916); Candidate for U.S. Senator from Michigan (1918)	$1.2 billion	Founder of Ford Motor Company
Doug Burgum	Republican	Governor of North Dakota (2017–2024); Candidate for U.S. President (2024)	$1.1 billion	Founded and Sold Great Plains Software to Microsoft
Nelson Rockefeller	Republican	Governor of New York (1959–1973); Candidate for U.S. President (1960, 1964, 1968); Vice President of the United States (1974–77)	$1 billion	Inheritance, grandson of John D. Rockefeller
Steve Forbes	Republican	Member of the Board for International Broadcasting (1985–1993); Candidate for U.S. President (1996, 2000)	$430 million	Editor, publisher
Kanye West	Independent; Birthday Party	Candidate for U.S. President (2020)	$400 million	Founder of GOOD Music, CEO of Donda, rapper, fashion designer
John Delaney	Democrat	U.S. Representative from Maryland (2013–2019); Candidate for U.S. President (2020)	$230 million	Entrepreneur, co-founder of Health Care Financial Partners and CapitolSource
John Kerry	Democratic	U.S. Senator from Massachusetts (1985–2013); Democratic nominee for U.S. President (2004); Secretary of State (2013–2017)	$200 million	Marriage to Teresa Heinz, the widow of John Heinz, heir to the H. J. Heinz Company
Mitt Romney	Independent (before 1993); Republican (1993–present)	Candidate for U.S. Senator from Massachusetts (1994); Governor of Massachusetts (2003–2007); Republican nominee for U.S. President (2012); U.S. Senator from Utah (2019–2025)	$190–250 million	Former CEO of Bain Capital and Bain & Company, son of Michigan Governor George W. Romney
Ted Kennedy	Democratic	U.S. Senator from Massachusetts (1962–2009); Candidate for U.S. President (1980)	$163 million	Inherited stake in the Chicago Merchandise Mart
Al Gore	Democratic	U.S. Representative from Tennessee (1977–1985); U.S. Senator from Tennessee (1985–1993); Vice President (1993–2001); Candidate for U.S. President (1988, 2000)	$100 million	Son of attorney and Tennessee U.S. Senator Albert Gore Sr., who owned a stake in Occidental Petroleum, book and film deals
John Hancock	Federalist	President of the Continental Congress (1775–1777, 1785–86); Governor of Massachusetts (1780–85, 1787–93); Candidate for U.S. President (1788)	$100 million	Inherited a profitable mercantile business from his uncle
Hillary Clinton	Democratic (1968–present)	First Lady of the United States (1993–2001); U.S. Senator from New York (2001–2009); Candidate for U.S. President (2008, 2016); Secretary of State (2009–2013)	$52–111 million	Book deals and public speaking fees from foreign/domestic sources
James M. Cox	Democratic	U.S. Representative from Ohio (1909–1913); Governor of Ohio (1913–15, 1917–21); Democratic nominee for U.S. President (1920)	$40 million (D. 1950) https://finance.yahoo.com/news/roseanne-barr-net-worth-down-174157708.html	
Samuel J. Tilden	Democratic	Chair of the New York Democratic Party (1866–1874); Governor of New York (1875–1876); Democratic nominee for U.S. President (1876)	$8.5 million (D. 1886)	Law practice, investments, and inheritance of Tilden's Extract

== Other U.S. politicians ==
Name	Party	Position	Net worth	Source (Notes)
Walter J. Kohler, Jr.	Republican	Governor of Wisconsin (1951–1957); Candidate for U.S. Senator from Wisconsin (1957)	$8.8 billion	Owner of Vollrath
Rick Caruso	Democratic	Candidate for Mayor of Los Angeles (2022)	$5.3 billion	Owner-founder of Caruso
Ronald Lauder	Republican	Deputy Assistant Secretary of Defense for European and NATO policy (1984–1986); Ambassador to Austria (1986–1987); Candidate for Mayor of New York (1989)	$4.6 billion	Co-owner of Estée Lauder, owner of Central European Media Enterprises
JB Pritzker	Democratic	Governor of Illinois (2019–present)	$3.5 billion	Inheritance, family owns the Hyatt hotel chain
Penny Pritzker	Democratic	Secretary of Commerce (2013–2017); Special Representative for Ukraine's Economic Recovery (2023–2025)	$2.5 billion	Inheritance, family owns the Hyatt hotel chain
Bill Haslam	Republican	Mayor of Knoxville (2003–2011); Governor of Tennessee (2011–2019)	$2 billion	Son of Jim Haslam, founder of Pilot Corporation, and former CEO of the e-commerce and catalog division of Saks Fifth Avenue
Mark Dayton	Democratic	Auditor of Minnesota (1991–1995); U.S. Senator from Minnesota (2001–2007); Governor of Minnesota (2011–2019)	$1.6 billion	Great-grandson of George Dayton, the founder of Target
Betsy DeVos	Republican	Chair of the Michigan Republican Party (1996–2000; 2003–2005); Secretary of Education (2017–2021)	$1.25 billion	Daughter of Edgar Prince, founder of Prince Corporation; daughter-in-law of Richard DeVos, co-founder of Amway; sister of Erik Prince, founder of Blackwater
Jim Justice	Republican (before 2015, 2017–present); Democratic (2015–2017)	Governor of West Virginia (2017–2025); United States Senator from West Virginia (2025–present)	$1.2 billion	Inherited ownership of Bluestone Industries and Bluestone Coal Corporation, founder of Bluestone Farms. Owner of 70 active mines in 5 states as of 2014. As of 2025 James Justice has a negative net worth. https://fortune.com/2025/10/24/jim-justice-former-governor-west-virginia-senator-billionaire-new-worth/ https://www.forbes.com/sites/christopherhelman/2025/01/10/this-former-billionaire-and-new-us-senator-is-now-broke/
Winthrop Paul Rockefeller	Republican	Lieutenant Governor of Arkansas (1996–2006)	1.2 billion	Member of the Rockefeller Family
Richard C. Blum	Democratic	First gentleman of San Francisco (1980–1988); Regent of the University of California (2002–2022)	$1 billion	President of Blum Capital
Linda McMahon	Republican	Candidate for U.S. Senate from Connecticut (2010; 2012); Administrator of the Small Business Administration (2017–2019) Secretary of Education (2025–incumbent)	$938 million–1.1 billion	Married to Vince McMahon, who inherited the professional wrestling business founded by his grandfather, Jess McMahon, now known as WWE
Herb Kohl	Democrat	U.S. Senator from Wisconsin (1989–2012)	$630 million–1.5 billion	Inheritance, son of Max Kohl, founder of Kohl's; former owner of the Milwaukee Bucks of the NBA
C. S. Mott	Republican	Mayor of Flint, Michigan (1912–1914; 1918–1919)	$800 million	Co-founder of General Motors
Wilbur Ross	Republican	Secretary of Commerce (2017–2021)	$600 million	Founder of private equity firm WL Ross & Co
Scott Bessent	Republican	Secretary of the Treasury (2025–incumbent)	$521 million	Founder of Key Square Group, real estate investor
Kelly Loeffler	Republican	U.S. Senator from Georgia (2020–2021)	$500 million+	Married to Jeffrey Sprecher, founder and CEO of Intercontinental Exchange
Jane Harman	Democratic	United States Representative (1993–1999; 2001–2011)	$500 million	Inheritance, home and car audio manufacturing corporation
Bruce Rauner	Republican	Governor of Illinois (2015–2019)	$500 million+	Chairman of GTCR
Amo Houghton	Republican	U.S. Representative from New York (1987–2005)	$475 million	Former CEO and descendant of the founder of Corning Glass Works
Glenn Youngkin	Republican	Governor of Virginia (2022–2026)	$470 million	Former CEO of The Carlyle Group
Jared Polis	Democratic	U.S. Representative from Colorado (2009–2019); Governor of Colorado (2019–incumbent)	$388 million	Founder of ProFlowers
Phil Bredesen	Democratic	Mayor of Nashville (1993–1999); Governor of Tennessee (2003–2011)	Up to $358 million	Founder of HealthAmerica Corporation
Rex Tillerson	Republican	Secretary of State (2017–2018)	$325 million	Former CEO of ExxonMobil
Greg Gianforte	Republican	U.S. Representative from Montana (2017–2021); Governor of Montana (2021–incumbent)	$315 million	Founder of RightNow Technologies
Gina Raimondo	Democratic	General Treasurer of Rhode Island (2011–2015); Governor of Rhode Island (2015–2021); Secretary of Commerce (2021–2025)	$300 million	Founder of Judith Point Capital, venture capitalist, and fund development executive
Jon Corzine	Democratic	U.S. Senator from New Jersey (2001–2006); Governor of New Jersey (2006–2010)	$300 million	Former CEO of Goldman Sachs
Terry Kohler	Republican	Candidate for Governor of Wisconsin (1982)	$300 million	Member of the Kohler Family
Steven Mnuchin	Republican	Secretary of the Treasury (2017–2021)	$300 million	Former executive of Goldman Sachs
Michael McCaul	Republican	U.S. Representative from Texas (2005–incumbent)	$294 million	Son-in-law of Lowry Mays, founder of Clear Channel Communications
Rick Scott	Republican	Governor of Florida (2011–2019); U.S. Senator from Florida (2019–incumbent)	$255 million	Founder of Columbia Hospital Corporation
Mark Warner	Democratic	Chair of the Virginia Democratic Party (1993–1995); Candidate for U.S. Senator from Virginia (1996); Governor of Virginia (2002–2006); U.S. Senator from Virginia (2009–incumbent)	$243 million	Early investor in Nextel Communications
Dan Goldman	Democratic	Candidate for Attorney General of New York (2022); U.S. Representative from New York (2023–incumbent)	$253 million	Heir to the Levi's fortune
Darrell Issa	Republican	Candidate for U.S. Senate from California (1998); U.S. Representative from California (2001–2019; 2021–incumbent); Nominee for Director of the U.S. Trade and Development Agency (2019)	$220 million	Founder of Directed Electronics
Rick Snyder	Republican	Governor of Michigan (2011–2019)	$220 million	Business, venture capital/investment
Elizabeth Frawley Bagley	Democratic	Ambassador to Portugal (1994–1997); Special Advisor to the Secretary of State (2010–2013; 2014–2017); Delegate to the United Nations General Assembly (2012); Ambassador to Brazil (2023–incumbent)	$220 million	Widow of Smith Bagley, co-owner of Cellular One
Trudy Busch Valentine	Democratic	Candidate for U.S. Senator from Missouri (2022)	$215 million	Daughter of Gussie Busch
Joseph P. Kennedy Sr.	Democratic	Chair of the Securities and Exchange Commission (1934–1935); Chair of the Maritime Commission (1937–1938); U.S. Ambassador to the UK (1938–1940)	$200–400 million	Stock investor, real estate investor, executive at Bethlehem Steel, organizer of RKO, financier of Hollywood films, owner of the distribution rights to Scotch whiskey in the United States, owner of Merchandise Mart, and President of Columbia Trust Bank
Oveta Culp Hobby	Democratic (before 1953); Republican (after 1953)	Administrator of the Federal Security Agency (1953); Secretary of Health, Education, and Welfare (1953–1955)	$200 million	Owner of the Houston Post
Gordon Sondland	Republican	Oregon State Liaison to the White House (2003–2007); Member of the Commission on White House Fellows (2007–2010); Ambassador to the European Union (2018–2020)	Up to $185 million	Chairman of Provenance Hotels
Carl Paladino	Democratic (before 2005); Republican (2005–present)	Candidate for Governor of New York (2010); Candidate for U.S. Representative from New York (2022)	$150 million	Retail real estate developer
Gino Campana	Republican	Fort Collins City Councillor (2013–2017); Candidate for Senator from Colorado (2022)	$140.5 million	Real estate developer
Ralph K. Davies	Democratic	Deputy Administrator of the Petroleum Administration for War (1942–1946)	$127 million	Chairman of American President Lines Standard Oil executive
Bernie Moreno	Republican	Candidate for U.S. Senator from Ohio (2022); U.S. Senator from Ohio (2025–incumbent)	$105.7 million	Car dealerships, blockchain investments
Mehmet Oz	Republican	Candidate for U.S. Senator from Pennsylvania (2022)	$100–$500 million	Reality television personality
Arnold Schwarzenegger	Republican	Governor of California (2003–2011)	$100–$200 million	Real estate, acting
Heidi Ganahl	Republican	Regent of the University of Colorado (2017–2023); Republican Nominee for Governor of Colorado (2022)	$100 million	Founder and CEO of Camp Bow Wow

== See also ==
- List of current members of the United States Congress by wealth
- List of presidents of the United States by net worth
