= Microsoft Forecaster =

Microsoft Forecaster is a software product used for organizational budgeting and planning. While not dependent on Microsoft Dynamics ERP packages, Microsoft Forecaster is most often positioned and sold as an add-on to Microsoft Dynamics general ledgers (Microsoft Dynamics AX, Microsoft Dynamics GP, Microsoft Dynamics NAV and Microsoft Dynamics SL).

== History ==
Microsoft Forecaster originated from a company called eBudgets.com, based in Plainsboro, New Jersey. eBudgets.com was acquired by FRx Software Corporation in 2001. Owned by Great Plains Software, FRx expanded its product offerings into budgeting and forecasting. Subsequently, Great Plains (FRx and eBudgets) was purchased by Microsoft, where it was run as a wholly owned subsidiary. At the time eBudgets.com was purchased by FRx Software, it had two separate offerings; Helmsman, a client-server offering written in C++, and a product called eBudgets.com, which was developed to eventually provide a web based replacement to Helmsman. eBudgets.com was primarily offered in a hosted Application Service Provider (ASP) environment. Following the acquisition, the eBudgets.com offering was renamed to FRx Forecaster, while Helmsman was rebranded to FRx Helmsman.

== Product Discontinuation ==
Microsoft Forecaster is not available to new customers. With the release of Microsoft Dynamics GP 2016 Microsoft Forecaster will not be available or supported for new Microsoft Dynamics GP 2016 customers.
