= Elizabeth Bagley =

American diplomat (born 1952)

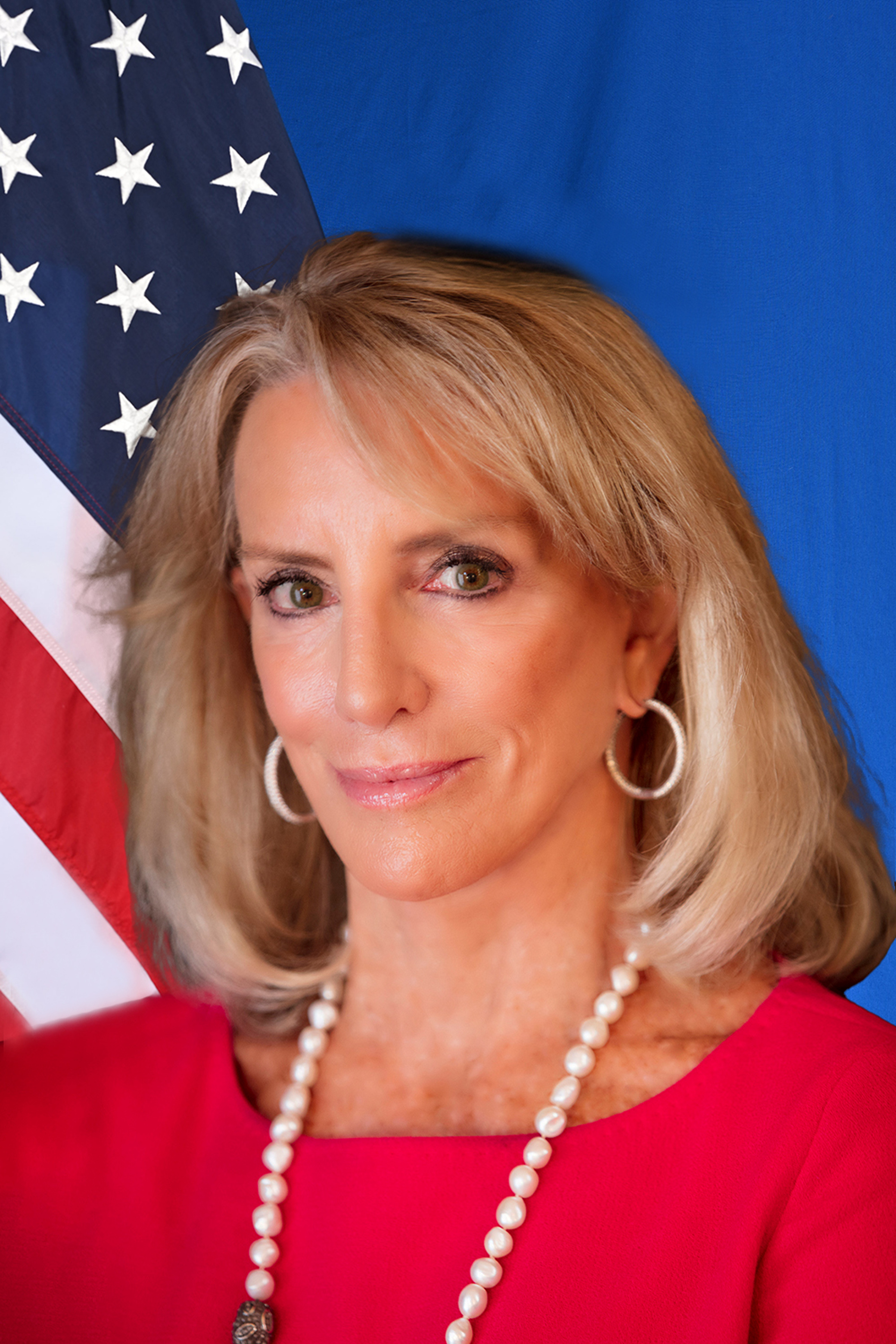
- Bagley in 2023

United States Ambassador to Brazil
- In office February 3, 2023 – January 20, 2025
- President: Joe Biden
- Preceded by: Todd C. Chapman
- Succeeded by: Daniel Perez

Special Advisor for Secretary's Initiatives
- In office January 20, 2014 – January 20, 2017
- President: Barack Obama
- Preceded by: Herself
- Succeeded by: Position abolished
- In office October 2010 – September 2013
- President: Barack Obama
- Preceded by: Position established
- Succeeded by: Herself

Special Representative for Global Partnerships
- In office June 18, 2009 – September 2010
- President: Barack Obama
- Preceded by: Position established
- Succeeded by: Kris Balderston

United States Ambassador to Portugal
- In office September 21, 1994 – October 3, 1997
- President: Bill Clinton
- Preceded by: Sharon Wilkinson (Acting)
- Succeeded by: Gerald McGowan

Personal details
- Born: Elizabeth Frawley; July 13, 1952 (age 74) Elmira, New York, U.S.
- Party: Democratic
- Spouse: Smith Bagley (m. 1983; died 2010)
- Education: Regis College (BA); Georgetown University (JD)

Elizabeth Frawley Bagley (born July 13, 1952) is an American diplomat, attorney, political activist and philanthropist who had served the United States ambassador to Brazil in the Biden administration. She previously served as the United States ambassador to Portugal from 1994 to 1997.

== Early life and education ==
Bagley was born the second child of eight children to Judge John D. Frawley and Rosemary Frawley. In 1974, Bagley graduated cum laude with a Bachelor of Arts degree in French and Spanish from Regis College in Weston, Massachusetts. She is a 1987 graduate of the Georgetown University Law School, where she obtained a Juris Doctor in international law. She also attended university and law school in France, Spain, and Austria, where she studied international trade law and public international law.

== Career ==
Bagley has served in four presidential administrations as a diplomat.

During the Carter administration, she served as Congressional liaison officer for The Panama Canal Treaties in the Department of State. Additionally, she was special assistant to Sol Linowitz, a top diplomat for President Jimmy Carter, for the Camp David Accords from 1979 to 1980. In the twilight of Carter's presidency, she was the Congressional liaison to the Conference on Security and Cooperation in Europe from 1980 to 1981.

In the Clinton administration, she was appointed to serve as U.S. Ambassador to Portugal from 1994 to 1997. She later served as senior advisor under Secretary of State Madeleine Albright, where she established and headed the Office of Media Programming Acquisition for the newly independent Balkan states. She also served as a United States Senate liaison for NATO Enlargement.

As an international law attorney, she was adjunct professor of law at Georgetown University in Washington from 1991 to 1993.

In the Obama administration, she twice served as the special advisor for Secretary's Initiatives, and was appointed by President Obama as the U.S. Delegate to the United Nations General Assembly in September 2012. Prior to assuming those posts, she was the Special Representative for Global Partnerships in the Office of the Secretary of State.

President Joe Biden nominated Bagley to be the next United States Ambassador to Brazil on January 19, 2022. Hearings on her nomination were held before the Senate Foreign Relations Committee on May 18, 2022. The committee was deadlocked on her nomination on June 23, 2022. Her nomination was considered controversial as comments came to light that were linked to anti-Semitic tropes, including acknowledging Israel's capital of Jerusalem as "stupid." Her nomination was discharged from the committee by a unanimous consent on December 6, 2022. The United States Senate confirmed her nomination by voice vote on December 14, 2022. On January 9, 2023, she was sworn into office by Vice President Kamala Harris. She presented her credentials to President Luiz Inácio Lula da Silva on February 3, 2023.

== Associations and memberships ==
Bagley is a member of both Massachusetts and District of Columbia bar associations. She was The American Ireland Fund's Nantucket Celebration honoree in 2009 for her philanthropy towards the Republic of Ireland for more than 30 years. She also serves on the Board of Directors of the National Democratic Institute.

== Awards and recognition ==
In 1997, Bagley was awarded the Grand Cross of Prince Henry the Navigator, the highest civilian honor in Portugal. She received a Legum Doctor (LL.D.) from Regis College in 2003. In 2005, she was the recipient of the Global Democracy Award from the International Women's Democracy Center in March and the Ellis Island Medal of Honor in May of the same year.

== Political involvement ==
=== Political donations and fundraising for the Democratic Party ===
Bagley is a major political donor and fundraiser who "over the years [has] raised millions of dollars for Democratic candidates." Her late husband, Smith W. Bagley (1935–2010), was an heir to the R. J. Reynolds tobacco fortune and a Finance Chair for the Democratic National Committee, and the Bagleys were regarded as "two of the heaviest financial hitters in the [Democratic] party." Closely associated with the Clintons since Bill Clinton’s 1992 presidential campaign, She was a major fundraiser during Hillary Clinton’s presidential campaigns in 2008 and 2016. Additionally, she and her husband have contributed over $1,000,000 to the Clinton Foundation. She was also "part of the national finance team for the Obama campaign, having personally raised over $350,000" as of August 2008. Bagley also "raised the maximum $600,000 for President Obama's inauguration events" in 2009. President Obama visited her residence in the Georgetown neighborhood of Washington D.C. in 2011, and First Lady Michelle Obama was the main speaker at a fundraiser at her home on Mothers Day, May 2012.

== Philanthropy ==
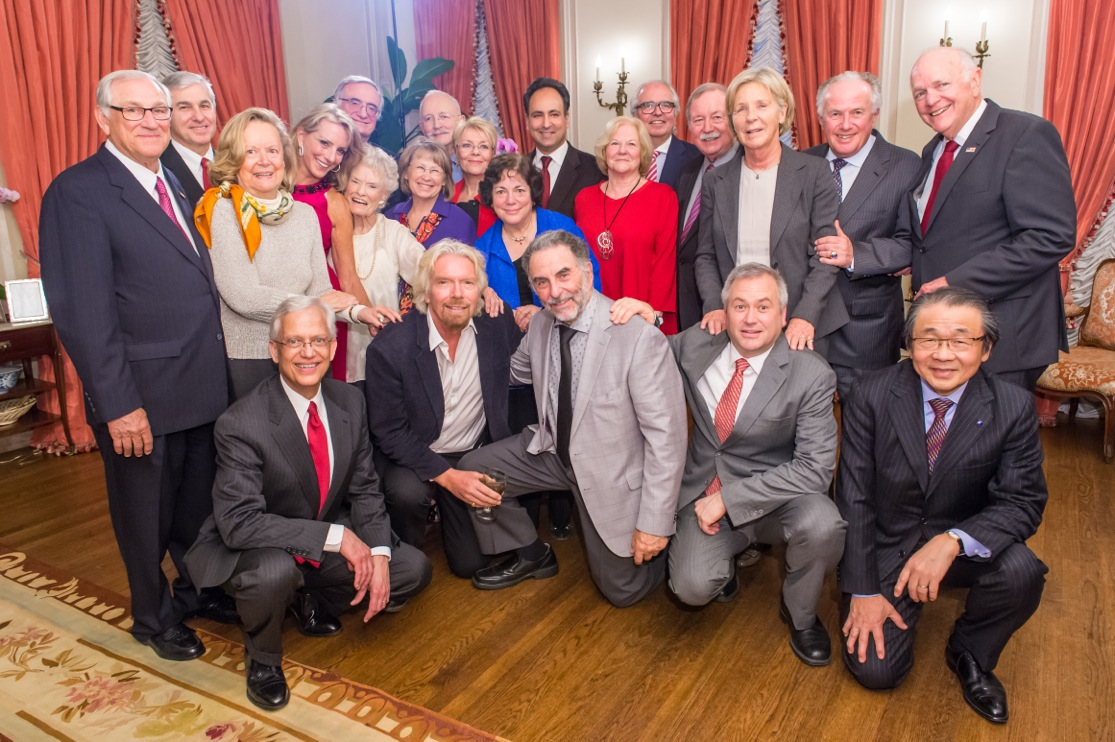
Elizabeth Frawley Bagley with the Board of Directors of the International Centre for Missing & Exploited Children

She is a board member for The American Ireland Fund, the National Democratic Institute for International Affairs and the Carnegie Endowment for International Peace. She is also a member of the Council on Foreign Relations.

== Personal life ==
On December 17, 1983, she married Smith Bagley, a social activist, Democratic fundraiser, business executive, and the grandson of R.J. Reynolds. He died in January 2010 at age 74. Together, they had two children: Vaughan Elizabeth Bagley and Conor Reynolds Bagley.

She resides in Washington, D.C. She also owns a house in Nantucket.

Bagley and her children own the operations of cell phone operator Cellular One in Northeastern Arizona and northwestern New Mexico, under the holding company Smith Bagley Inc. which does business as Cellular One of East Arizona.
