= Andrew O'Brien (politician) =

Drew O'Brien
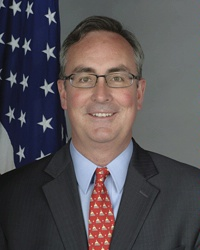

Special Representative for Global Partnerships
- Incumbent
- Assumed office May 20, 2013
- President: Barack Obama
- Preceded by: Kris Balderston

Personal details
- Born: Marshfield, Massachusetts, U.S.
- Education: University of Massachusetts, Amherst; Northeastern University

Andrew O'Brien is the Special Representative for Global Partnerships in the U.S. Secretary of State's Office of Global Partnerships at the U.S. Department of State. He was appointed to this position on May 20, 2013.

Previously, O'Brien served as Secretary John Kerry's Massachusetts State Director in the United States Senate since 2007, reprising a role he had served in from 2003 to 2005. Prior to that, O'Brien worked on Thomas Menino's successful campaign for mayor of Boston in 1993. O'Brien served as a Special Assistant to the Mayor for several years and was later appointed Executive Director of the Mayor's Office of Neighborhood Services. Later in his career at Boston City Hall, O'Brien served as a Special Assistant to the Director of the Boston Redevelopment Authority. He went on to serve as Chief of Staff to the Massachusetts State Lottery Commission. And, in the academic years of 2005/2006 and 2006/2007, O'Brien served as Deputy Chancellor of the University of Massachusetts Boston.

O'Brien also worked in several capacities throughout the course of Secretary Kerry's 2004 presidential campaign where he spent time across the country, particularly in Iowa, New Hampshire, Ohio, as well as at the Democratic National Convention in Boston.

In 2007, O'Brien was named one of the city's Ten Outstanding Young Leaders by the Boston Jaycees. Andrew O'Brien holds a bachelor's degree from the University of Massachusetts Amherst, and a Master of Public Administration degree from Northeastern University.

Diplomatic posts
Preceded by Kris Balderston	Special Representative for Global Partnerships; 2013–present	Incumbent
