= Microsoft Office Accounting =

Defunct accounting software application from Microsoft

- Developer(s): Microsoft
- Final release: 2009 / 17 February 2009; 16 years ago
- Operating system: Microsoft Windows
- Type: Accounting
- License: Pro edition: Shareware; Expression edition: Freeware
- Website: office.microsoft.com/accounting

Microsoft Office Accounting (formerly Small Business Accounting) is a discontinued accounting software application from Microsoft targeted towards small businesses that had between 1 and 25 employees.

The last version, Microsoft Office Accounting 2009, was available in both Express and Professional editions. It included several new features, including tax preparation add-ins, 20 new reports and a Spanish language pack.

On 16 November 2009, Microsoft discontinued its distribution of the Microsoft Office Accounting product line in the US and UK. Licensees are to receive mainstream and extended product support from Microsoft or one of its partners through January 2022.

== Express edition ==
Microsoft Office Accounting Express was the freeware version of Accounting, made available for download and also being distributed in certain editions of Microsoft Office 2007, including Professional, Small Business and Ultimate editions. This free version did not support local requirements outside of UK and USA.

== History ==
Microsoft Office Accounting has its roots in the a 2006 release called Microsoft Small Business Accounting. A new iteration was released in 2007 with the same name. In 2008, however, the name was changed to Microsoft Office Accounting and it retained that name in 2009, which was its last iteration.

Version history
Name	Service pack	Version	Date published	Note
Accounting 2009	Service Pack 1	4.0.2325.0	20 February 2009	Support started on 24 February 2009
Accounting 2009	Service Pack 2	4.0.3318.0	27 October 2009	
Accounting 2009	Service Pack 3	4.0.3610.0	19 February 2010	

== See also ==
- Microsoft Small Business Financials
- Microsoft Dynamics
