= Liz Shuler =

American labor activist (born 1970)

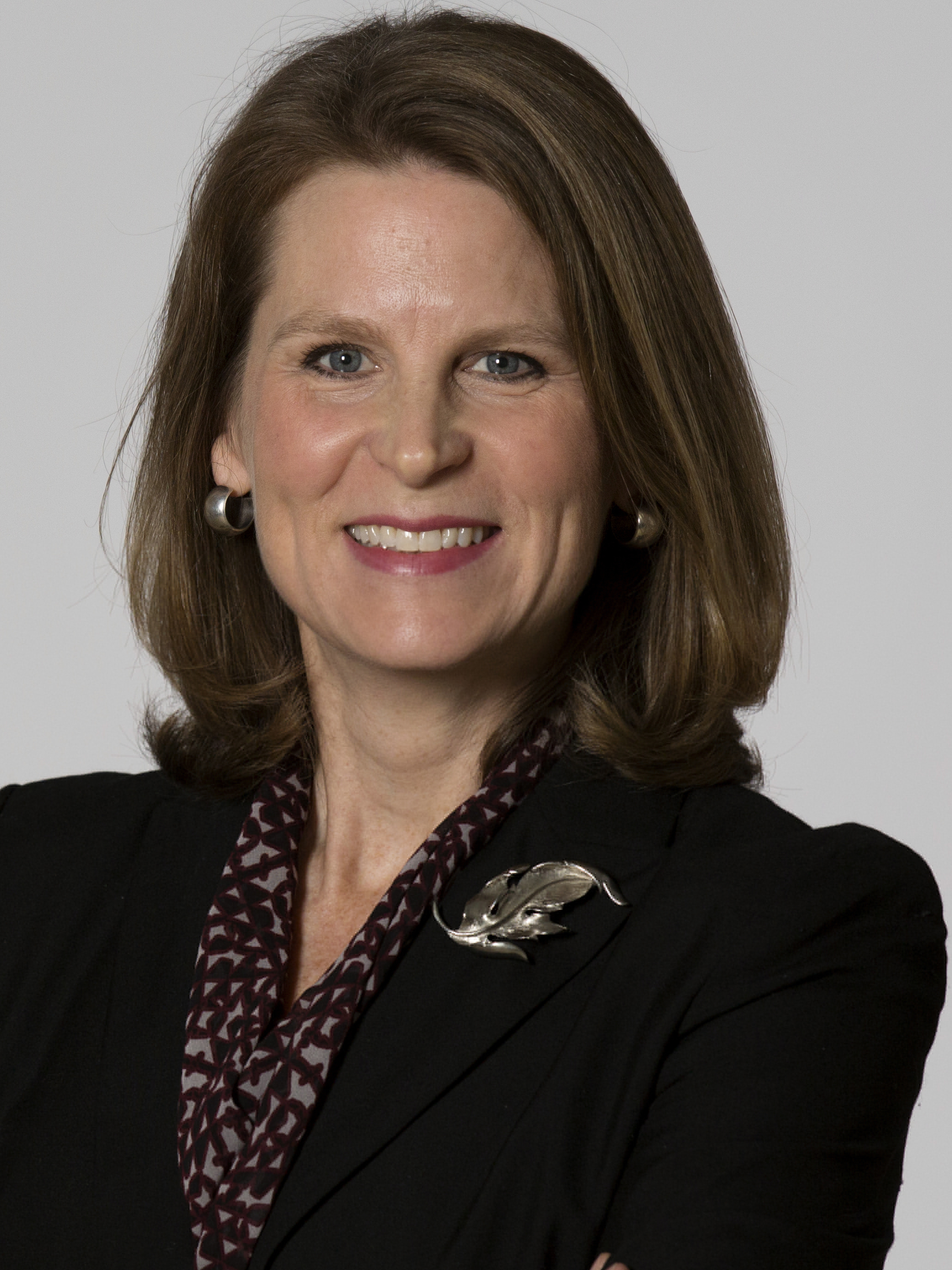

6th President of the AFL-CIO
- Incumbent
- Assumed office August 5, 2021 (Note: Acting: August 5, 2021 – August 20, 2021)
- Preceded by: Richard Trumka

6th Secretary-Treasurer of the AFL-CIO
- In office September 16, 2009 – August 20, 2021
- Preceded by: Richard Trumka
- Succeeded by: Fred Redmond

Personal details
- Born: Elizabeth H. Shuler; 1970 (age 55–56) Gladstone, Oregon, U.S.
- Party: Democratic
- Education: University of Oregon (BA)

Elizabeth "Liz" H. Shuler (born 1970) is an American labor activist and president of the AFL–CIO. She is the first woman to be elected president of the federation. She previously served as the federation's secretary-treasurer; she was the first woman and, as of 2009, the youngest person to hold that position. She is the highest-ranking woman in the labor federation's history. The period from her election until the retirement of Arlene Holt Baker in 2013 marked the first time that women held two of the three officer positions in the AFL–CIO.

== Early life and IBEW career ==
Shuler was born to Lance and Joyce Shuler in 1970. Her father was an electrical lineman for Portland General Electric (PGE), and her mother worked there as a secretary. Although her father was a union member, clerical workers at PGE were not unionized. Shuler was raised in the city of Gladstone, Oregon, and attended public schools there. She received a Bachelor of Arts degree in journalism from the University of Oregon in 1992. While in college, she worked summers at PGE and was active in the state Democratic Party.

Shuler first became active in union work after college. Her first job was as a union organizer for the International Brotherhood of Electrical Workers (IBEW) Local 125, working on a campaign to organize clerical workers at PGE. She became a lobbyist for the IBEW in 1997, representing the union before the Oregon Legislature. She successfully worked to defeat a bill (promoted by Enron) to deregulate Oregon's electricity market. She also taught in the union's Construction Organizing Membership Education and Training (COMET) and Membership Education and Mobilization for Organizing (MEMO) union organizing programs. Shuler served on the State of Oregon Management-Labor Advisory Committee on Workers' Compensation and was appointed an IBEW delegate to the Northwest Oregon Central Labor Council. In 1998, she led the AFL–CIO's successful effort to defeat California Proposition 226, which would have denied dues check-off to public employees belonging to unions and required all union members in the state to annually give their assent before any portion of their dues could be used for political purposes.

After the campaign in California, Shuler was appointed an IBEW international representative and moved to Washington, D.C., where she worked in the IBEW's Political and Legislative Affairs Department. She was appointed executive assistant to IBEW President Edwin Hill in June 2004, making her the highest-ranking woman in the union's history at that time. Shuler supervised and coordinated 11 of the IBEW's departments, including its education, research, political and legislative affairs, public relations, and workplace safety divisions.

== AFL–CIO career ==
On July 7, 2009, AFL–CIO Secretary-Treasurer Richard Trumka, then seeking election to the labor federation's presidency, chose Shuler as his running mate for secretary-treasurer. Gregory Junemann, president of the International Federation of Professional and Technical Engineers, also ran for the position. Shuler defeated Junemann on September 16, 2009.

Shuler stated her intention to spend much of her term reaching out to workers under the age of 35 and using new media to reach out to workers, their families, and union supporters. She also said she would work with the AFL–CIO's affiliates to balance the federation's budget; in 2008, it had a deficit and liabilities that exceeded its assets by $2.3 million.

Trumka appointed Shuler head of the AFL–CIO's youth outreach efforts. Under the AFL–CIO constitution, Shuler became the acting AFL–CIO president upon Trumka's death on August 5, 2021. On August 20, she was elected to fill the remainder of Trumka's term through June 2022. On June 12, 2022, Shuler was unanimously elected to a full four-year term as president of the AFL–CIO, becoming the first woman elected to serve as leader of the AFL–CIO in its 68-year history.

Shuler spoke at the 2024 Democratic National Convention on August 19, 2024.

== Other activities ==
Shuler is active in the Women's Campaign Fund, a political action committee that supports pro-choice women running for election to political office, and she is a supporter of the International Women's Democracy Center. She has also been active in the Oregon and Washington chapters of Women in the Trades, organizations that promote opportunities for women in the blue-collar skilled trades.
