= Microsoft Small Business Financials =

Microsoft business accounting software package

Microsoft Small Business Financials (formerly Microsoft Small Business Manager) is a business accounting software package. The software is targeting growing small businesses that require more than basic accounting software: with fewer than 25 employees and less than $10 million of revenue. It is part of Microsoft Dynamics (formerly Microsoft Business Solutions) family. It is based on Microsoft Dynamics GP and runs on top of free Microsoft MSDE or SQL Server Express database. Microsoft Small Business Financials and Microsoft Dynamics GP are built on the same platform, so migration to Microsoft Dynamics GP is very simple and straightforward.

The current version is 9.0. As of January 1, 2009 Small Business Financials 9.0 is no longer for sale to new customers.

The following features are included with the product:

- Financial (General ledger with Advanced Financial Analysis)
- Banking (Bank reconciliation/Cash flow management)
- Sales (Sales order processing/Accounts receivable)
- Purchasing (Purchase order/Accounts payable)
- Inventory (Item tracking)
- Foundation and Reporting (Report editor, SmartList, Microsoft Office Integration)
- Integration (Import wizard for Master Records / transactions)
- Microsoft SQL Server Desktop Engine

Additional features that may be purchased separately from Microsoft are:

- Crystal Reports
- Fixed assets
- FRx Designer User
- Magnetic Media
- US Payroll

In October 2008 Microsoft announced that Microsoft Small Business Financials is being discontinued and Microsoft is providing a highly discounted migration path to Dynamics GP.

== See also ==
- Microsoft Dynamics
- Microsoft Small Business Accounting
- Dexterity (programming language)
