= Political career of Donald Trump =

Political career of President of the US

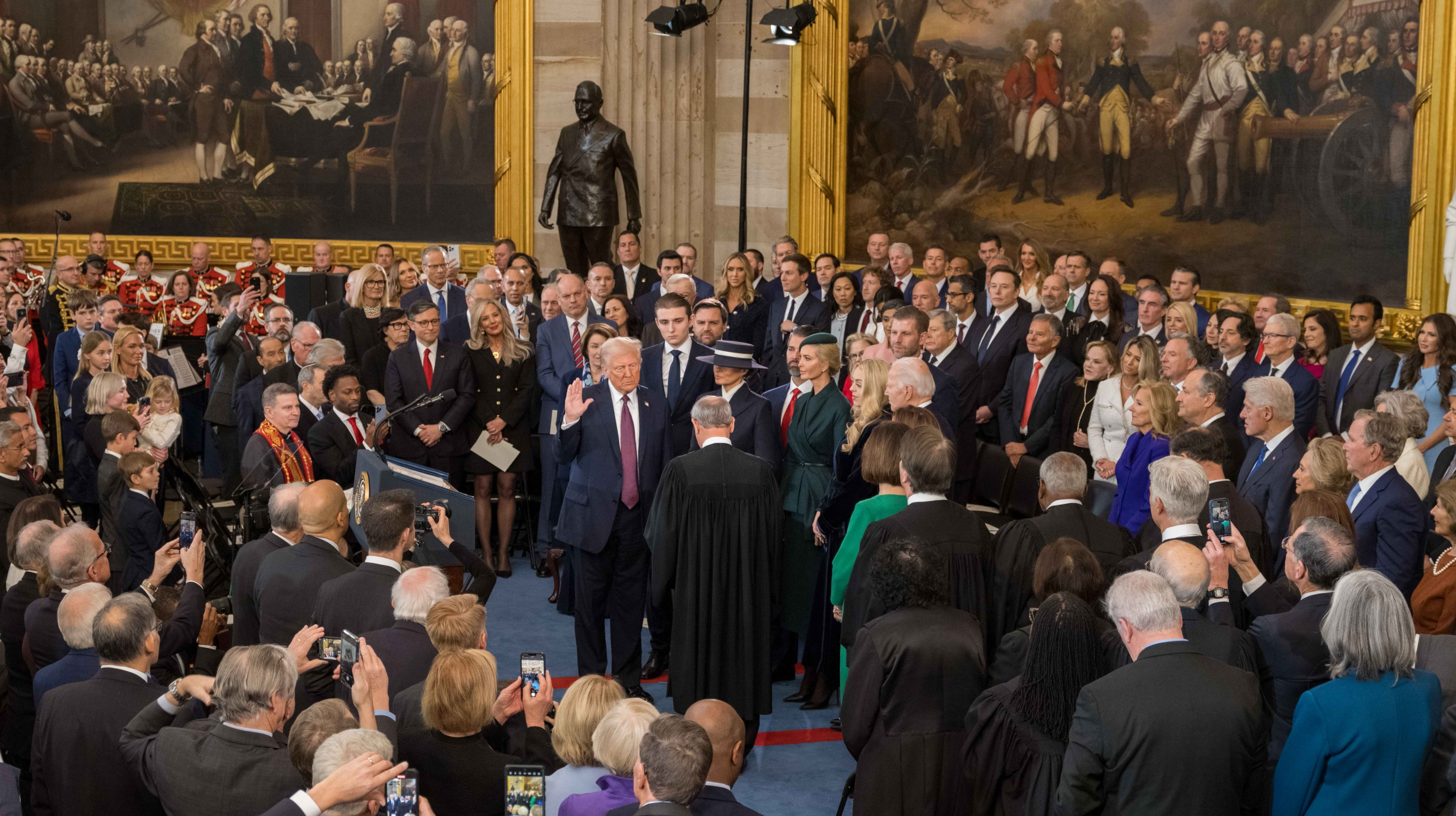
Trump's second inauguration as president of the United States, 2025

Since 2025, Donald Trump has been the 47th and current president of the United States, having won the 2024 presidential election. He previously served a separate, non-consecutive term from 2017 to 2021 as the 45th president.

Trump has officially run as a candidate for president four times, in 2000, 2016, 2020, and 2024; he also unofficially campaigned in 2012 and mulled a run in 2004. He won the 2016 general election through the Electoral College while losing the popular vote to Democratic nominee Hillary Clinton by 2.8 million votes, the largest margin ever to still win the presidency. He was thereby elected the 45th president of the United States on November 8, 2016, and inaugurated on January 20, 2017. He is the only American president to have no political or military service prior to his presidency. He unsuccessfully sought reelection in the 2020 presidential election, losing to Democratic nominee Joe Biden. After his first term, he was ranked by scholarly surveys as among the country's worst presidents. Among the American public, Trump's average 41 percent approval rating was the lowest of any president since Gallup began polling, and he left office with a 34 percent approval rating and 62 percent disapproval rating in his final polls.

Trump's involvement in politics began in the late 1970s and early '80s when he donated to the presidential campaigns of Ronald Reagan, Jimmy Carter, and later a PAC affiliated with Walter Mondale. Between 1982 and 1985, he would be involved in fundraising and financing for the Vietnam Veterans Plaza as co-chair of the Vietnam Veterans Memorial Commission and hosting of the 1984 National Awards Banquet as a special advisor to the President's Council on Physical Fitness and Sport.

Trump's overt political activity started with his publicly suggesting a run for president in the late 1980s. Ever since, Trump maintained a steady interest in politics, though he was not always considered a serious candidate. Trump has spoken at the Conservative Political Action Conference (CPAC) multiple times, with his first appearance in 2012; Trump gained increasing political notoriety with the public for his promotion of the birtherism conspiracy theory during this period, which has been described as having had "essentially launched his current political career." From 2013 to 2015, Trump continued to make political headlines but was still polling low and not taken seriously by analysts. Trump became the 2016 Republican nominee for president of the United States after beating sixteen other candidates during a controversial campaign. U.S. Intelligence officials later determined that the Government of the Russian Federation had illegally intervened in the election to aid Trump's victory. There was a large amount of cabinet and staff turnover in Trump's presidency, compared to other modern American presidents. Numerous allegations of misconduct by Trump resulted in investigations by Congress and Special Council, as well as two impeachments. He was president at the time of the outbreak of the COVID-19 pandemic.

On June 18, 2019, Trump announced that he would seek re-election in the 2020 presidential election. The election on November 3 was not called for either candidate for several days; on November 7, the Associated Press—along with major TV networks including CNN, ABC News, CBS News, NBC News, and Fox News—called the race for Joe Biden. Trump did not concede, despite the final election results not being close, and the administration did not begin cooperating with president-elect Biden's transition team until November 23. With one week remaining in his presidency, Trump was impeached by the House of Representatives for incitement of insurrection for his actions during the January 6 coup and attack on the United States Capitol, but was acquitted in the Republican-controlled Senate because the 57–43 vote in favor of convicting him fell short of the 2/3 supermajority (67 out of 100 senators) required for conviction. Trump continues to push the false idea that he won the 2020 election, which has led to ongoing controversy within the Republican party.

There are four major ongoing criminal investigations into Trump's criminal activity while in office. The chairman of Trump's presidential campaign, Paul Manafort; his chief political strategist, Steve Bannon; and his campaign counsel, Michael Cohen, have all been since sentenced to prison for various criminal acts connected to Trump's campaign and presidency. At least 8 other members of Trump's campaign have been charged with the commission of federal crimes.

== Political party changes ==
Trump's political party affiliation has changed numerous times. He registered as a Republican in Queens in 1969 and in Manhattan in 1987; a member of the Independence Party, the New York state affiliate of the Reform Party, in 1999; a Democrat in 2001; a Republican in 2009; unaffiliated in 2011; and a Republican in 2012.

== Early political involvement ==
=== Early campaign contributions ===
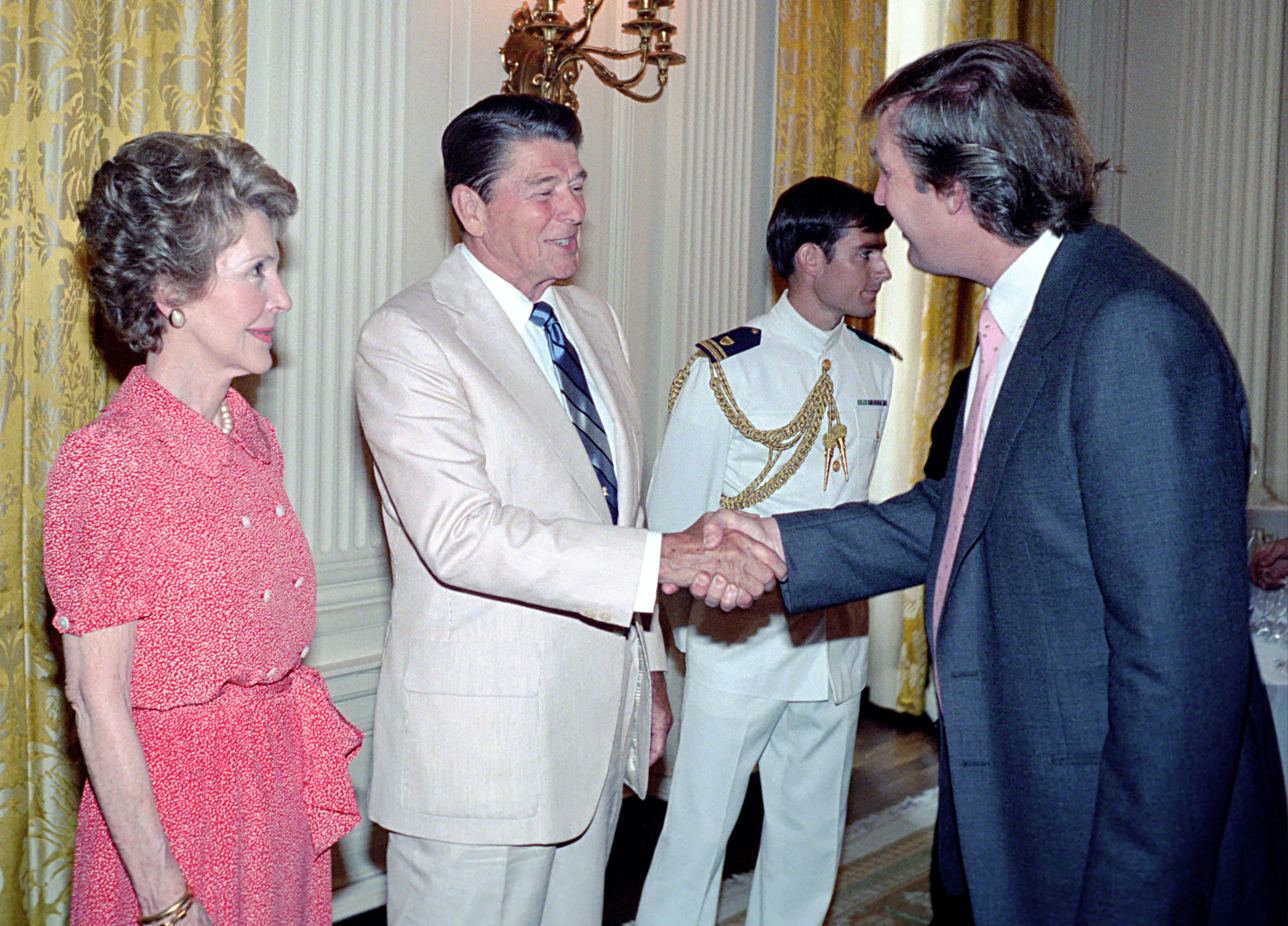
Trump and Reagan in 1983.

Donald Trump's earliest involvement in politics was reported in 1979, where he donated to Jimmy Carter’s and Ronald Reagan's presidential campaigns. Upon meeting Roger Stone through their mutual acquaintance with Roy Cohn, Donald Trump and his father, Fred Trump, would join the financial committee for Ronald Reagan’s 1980 presidential campaign. However, one month after Ronald Reagan announced his candidacy, the Trump family donated to Jimmy Carter’s presidential election campaign. In October 1981, Trump made an early campaign contribution to the political action committee of Walter Mondale’s 1984 presidential campaign.

=== New York Vietnam Veterans Memorial Commission ===
Trump's first official role in public affairs was as co-chairman of the New York Vietnam Veterans Memorial Commission, which he was appointed to alongside Scott Higgins by then-New York City mayor Ed Koch on November 2, 1982. Koch officially established the commission earlier in the year to finance the construction of the Vietnam Veterans Plaza, with half of the $1 million to be raised prospectively. The remaining funds were planned for a jobs program dedicated to veterans of the Vietnam War from New York City.

Trump's tenure on the commission was controversial among its membership, reportedly due to his lack of involvement in its regular work. His active participation was primarily limited to personally donating to and networking with potential financiers for contributions to the project.

During one of its earliest meetings in April 1984, which Trump was late to attend, its priority was determining how to fundraise even a tiny portion of the $1.4 million required for its efforts. This was mainly due to a public lack of interest in the commission’s work. During the meeting, Trump explained that he was on the commission because those who were drafted to fight in the Vietnam War received a “bad deal,” which was “about the worst thing that can happen to anyone.” He then presented a list of potential donors he was acquainted with to contribute to the project, which included Herschel Walker. He added that a fundraising event for the memorial would be held at Trump Tower, with then-U.S. President Ronald Reagan attending. Thus, the commission could raise the event’s ticket prices from $500 to $1,000.

The commission claimed that 500 individuals planned to attend, and the Trump Organization extended an official invite to Ronald and Nancy Reagan. However, both declined to participate, citing scheduling conflicts.

In November 1984, Trump was criticized by fellow commissioners for his involvement, explaining that he only attended two or three of the twenty meetings held. One official on the commission said Trump only attended its inaugural meeting, and the above in April when a Washington Post reporter, Lois Romano, shadowed him. In response to the criticism, he said, “That's interesting. I'll resign then. They're very small thinkers. They're stockbrokers in Vietnam, and they don't have it.” He further explained that he was never asked to be a working commission member, only agreeing to lend his name to its work.

In February of the following year, the fundraising campaign for the commission's work was renewed on the 10th anniversary of the end of the Vietnam War. On February 26, Trump pledged to donate $1 million if other commissioners could do the same by May 7. Pete Dawkins, a former brigadier general in the United States Army, a veteran of the Vietnam War, and at this point, a partner at Lehman Brothers, oversaw the fundraising campaign. Before this point, $800,000 had already been raised, with the plaza costing $500,000 of what had been raised. The remainder of what could be funded by the commission would be allocated to a job program for veterans.

However, Trump's tenure on the committee was defended by his co-chair, Scott Higgins, saying, “He's been a real friend of New York Vietnam Veterans. He donated his time, money, and even the Trump Tower to our major fundraising event, and we're counting on him to do even more in the future." The Friends of the Vietnam Veterans Plaza also praised his involvement, explaining that "It was Donald Trump's challenge to the City of New York, and his contribution of one million dollars, that was instrumental in the completion of this project," with the organization claiming that it succeeded in raising more than $3 million, though NYC Parks claims it was $2.5 million. Thomas Lipscomb wrote on USA Today that Eugene Gitelson could utilize what was financially contributed and raised by Donald Trump through the commission to establish the New York Vietnam Veterans’ Leadership Program, among the largest veterans support programs in the country, providing job training and networking opportunities. Another New York Vietnam Veterans Memorial member, Vincent McGowan, defended Trump’s support for veterans, pointing to his financial and venue support for them in the following years.

=== Federal advisory committees ===
==== President's Council on Physical Fitness and Sports ====
Donald Trump would serve as one of several dozen special advisors on the President's Council on Physical Fitness and Sports who were responsible for co-sponsoring and funding for the former's programs. This occurred as a result of then-president Ronald Reagan signing an executive order on February 2, 1982, to expand the council, part of which tasked the Secretary of Health and Human Services to "Enlist the active support and assistance of individual citizens, civic groups, private enterprise, voluntary organizations, and others in efforts to promote and improve the fitness of all Americans through regular participation in physical fitness and sports activities." On December 2, 1983, he would be an attendee of the PCPFS Special Advisors Winter Meeting in Annapolis, Maryland. Part of the meeting’s agenda included discussing his organizing of the National Fitness Foundation’s National Awards Dinner, which he would host at Trump Tower in 1984, with Ronald Reagan serving as the event's honorary chairman. He would remain in the position until September 30, 1991, as per an executive order by succeeding president George H. W. Bush, mandating the body continue in its form until that point.

==== President's Council for International Youth Exchange ====
After a presidential memorandum from Ronald Reagan was sent to USIA director Charles Z. Wick on December 2, 1982, directing him to form the President’s Council on International Youth Exchange, Trump would be appointed as a member to the body alongside numerous others. The commission was an independent agency tasked with facilitating the President's International Youth Exchange Initiative that would bring as many as 15,000 international students from other G7 countries to the United States, allowing them to attend domestic high schools and live with families. This was part of a broader effort to counter anti-American sentiment abroad during the later Cold War Trump's tenure would end on the council's official dissolution of May 25, 1985, with the body claiming to have enabled the arrival of 12,000 exchange students as part of the President's International Youth Exchange Initiative, raising just over $4.2 million from 80 companies for the above program outside the $10 million contributed by the federal government.

=== Recommendation of Paula Hawkins as Secretary of Transportation ===
On September 23, 1987, Donald Trump would send a letter to then-White House Chief of Staff Howard Baker, recommending Senator Paula Hawkins of Florida as Secretary of Transportation. Reagan however, nominated James H. Burnley IV instead.

== 1988 presidential election ==
Trump first floated the idea of running for president in 1987, placing full-page advertisements in three major newspapers, proclaiming "America should stop paying to defend countries that can afford to defend themselves." The advertisements advocated for "reducing the budget deficit, working for peace in Central America, and speeding up nuclear disarmament negotiations with the Soviet Union". DCCC chair Rep. Beryl Anthony Jr. told The New York Times that "the message Trump has been preaching is a Democratic message." Asked whether rumors of a presidential candidacy were true, Trump denied being a candidate but said, "I believe that if I did run for President, I'd win." In 1988, he approached Lee Atwater asking to be put into consideration as Republican nominee George H. W. Bush's running mate. Bush found the request "strange and unbelievable." According to a Gallup poll in December 1988, Trump was the tenth most admired man in America.

== 2000 presidential campaign ==
In 1999, Trump formed an exploratory committee to seek the nomination of the Reform Party for the 2000 presidential election. A July 1999 poll matching him against likely Republican nominee George W. Bush and likely Democratic nominee Al Gore showed Trump with seven percent support. Trump eventually dropped out of the race, but still went on to win the Reform Party primaries in California and Michigan. After his run, he left the party due to the involvement of David Duke, Pat Buchanan, and Lenora Fulani. He also considered running for president in 2004. In 2008, after endorsing Democrat Hillary Clinton in the primary, he endorsed Republican John McCain for president in the general election.

== 2012 presidential election ==
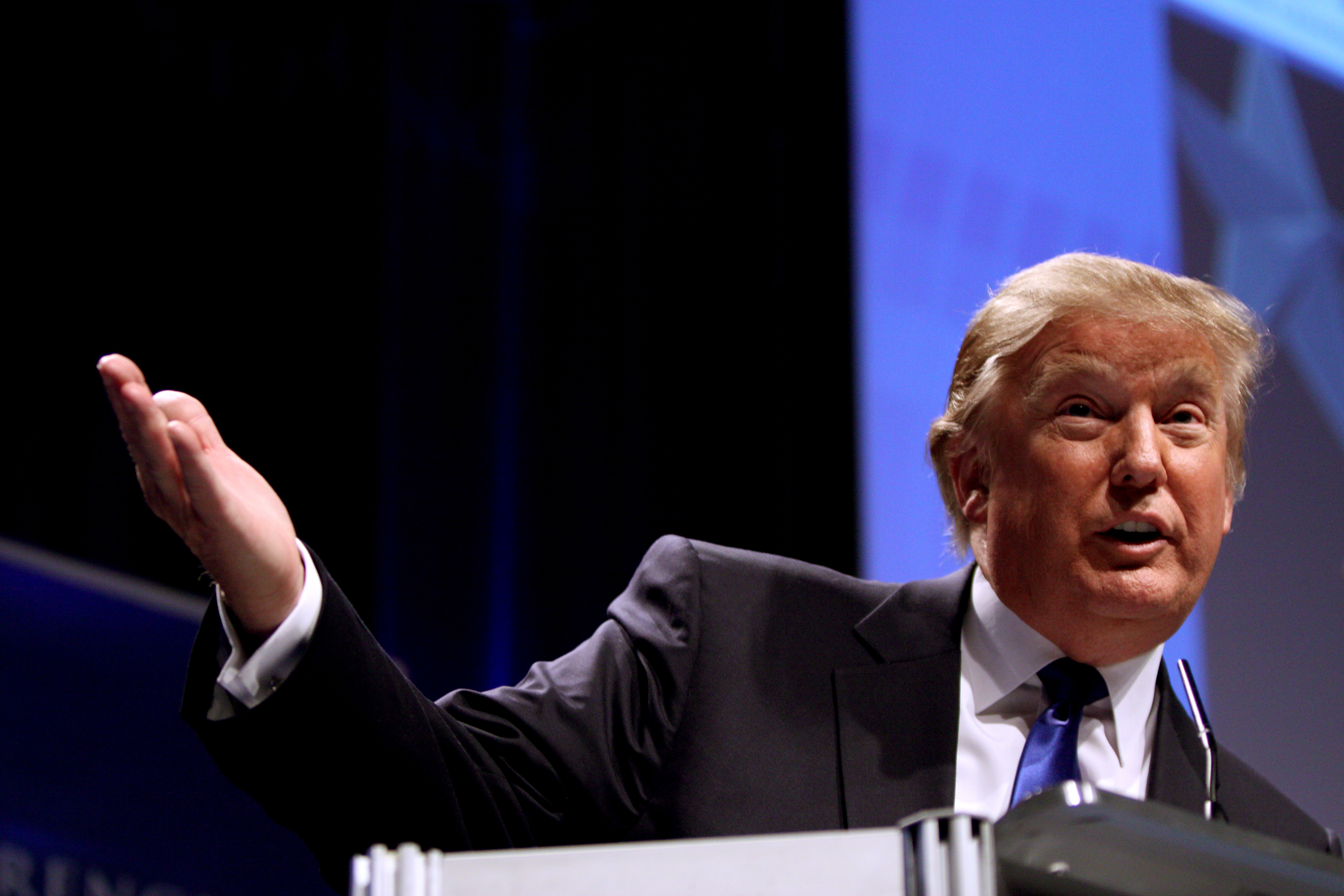
Trump speaking at the Conservative Political Action Conference, February 2011

Trump publicly speculated about running for president in the 2012 election, and made his first speaking appearance at the Conservative Political Action Conference (CPAC) in February 2011. The speech is credited for helping kick-start his political career within the Republican Party. On May 16, 2011, Trump announced he would not run for president in the 2012 election, putting an end to what he described as "unofficially campaigning". In February 2012, Trump endorsed Mitt Romney for president.

Trump's presidential ambitions were generally not taken seriously at the time. Trump's moves were interpreted by some media as possible promotional tools for his reality show The Apprentice. Before the 2016 election, The New York Times speculated that Trump "accelerated his ferocious efforts to gain stature within the political world" after the then U.S. president Barack Obama lampooned him at the White House Correspondents' Association Dinner in April 2011.

In 2011, according to Evan Jones, the headmaster of the New York Military Academy at the time, the then-superintendent Jeffrey Coverdale had demanded Trump's academic records, to hand them over to "prominent, wealthy alumni of the school who were Mr. Trump's friends" at their request. Coverdale said he had refused to hand over Trump's records to trustees of the school, and instead sealed Trump's records on campus. Jones said: "It was the only time in my education career that I ever heard of someone's record being removed." Coverdale further said: "It's the only time I ever moved an alumnus's records." The incident reportedly happened days after Trump demanded Obama's academic records.

== Political activities between 2013–2015 ==
In 2013, Trump spoke at CPAC again; he railed against illegal immigration, bemoaned Obama's "unprecedented media protection", advised against harming Medicare, Medicaid, and Social Security, and suggested that the government "take" Iraq's oil and use the proceeds to pay a million dollars each to families of dead soldiers.

In October 2013, New York Republicans circulated a memo suggesting Trump should run for governor of the state in 2014 against Andrew Cuomo. Trump responded that while New York had problems and its taxes were too high, he was not interested in the governorship. A February 2014 Quinnipiac poll had shown Trump losing to the more popular Cuomo by 37 points in a hypothetical election.

== 2016 presidential campaign ==
=== Republican primaries ===
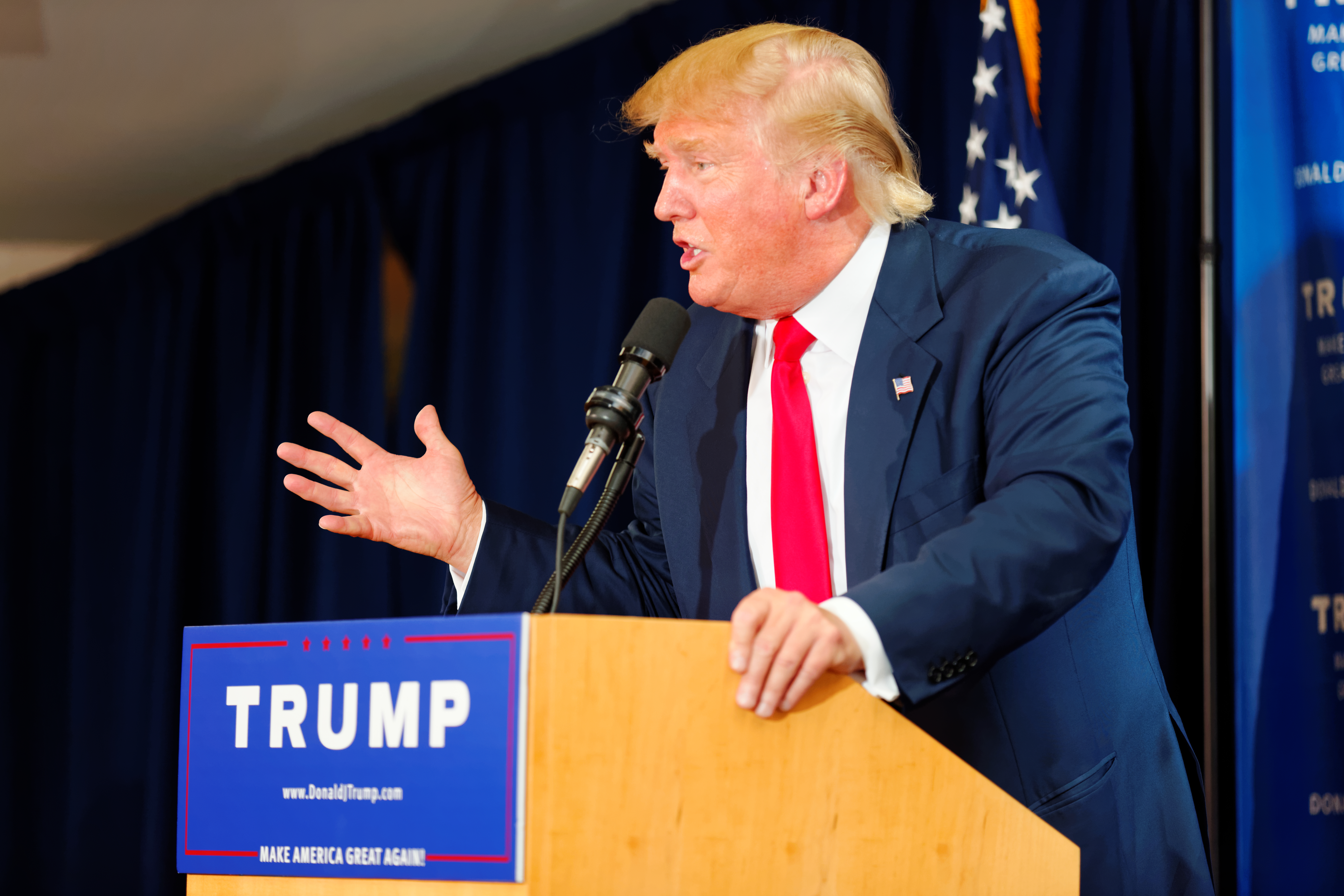
Trump campaigning in Laconia, New Hampshire, July 2015

On June 16, 2015, Trump announced his candidacy for President of the United States at Trump Tower in Manhattan. In the speech, Trump discussed illegal immigration, offshoring of American jobs, the U.S. national debt, and Islamic terrorism, which all remained large priorities during the campaign. He also announced his campaign slogan would be to "Make America Great Again". Trump said his wealth would make him immune to pressure from campaign donors. He declared that he was funding his own campaign; according to The Atlantic, "Trump's claims of self-funding have always been dubious at best and actively misleading at worst."

Much of Trump's campaign centered on his promise that, if elected president, he would build a border wall on the United States–Mexico border, a campaign promise which he never fulfilled. In the primaries, Trump was one of seventeen candidates for the 2016 Republican nomination. At the time, this was the largest presidential field in American history. Trump's campaign was initially not taken seriously by political analysts, but he quickly rose to the top of opinion polls. The New Yorker attributed Trump's clinching of the Republican nomination largely to the party base's "general disgust with professional politicians" and Trump's ability to distinguish himself from traditional Republican politicians.

On Super Tuesday, Trump received the most votes, and he remained the front-runner throughout the primaries. By March 2016, Trump was poised to win the Republican nomination. Following a landslide win in Indiana on May 3, 2016 – which prompted the remaining candidates Ted Cruz and John Kasich to suspend their presidential campaigns – RNC chairman Reince Priebus declared Trump the presumptive Republican nominee.

=== General election campaign ===
After becoming the presumptive Republican nominee, Trump shifted his focus to the general election. Trump began campaigning against Hillary Clinton, who became the presumptive Democratic nominee on June 6, 2016. Clinton had established a significant lead over Trump in national polls throughout most of 2016. In early July, Clinton's lead narrowed in national polling averages following the FBI's re-opening of its investigation into her then ongoing email controversy.

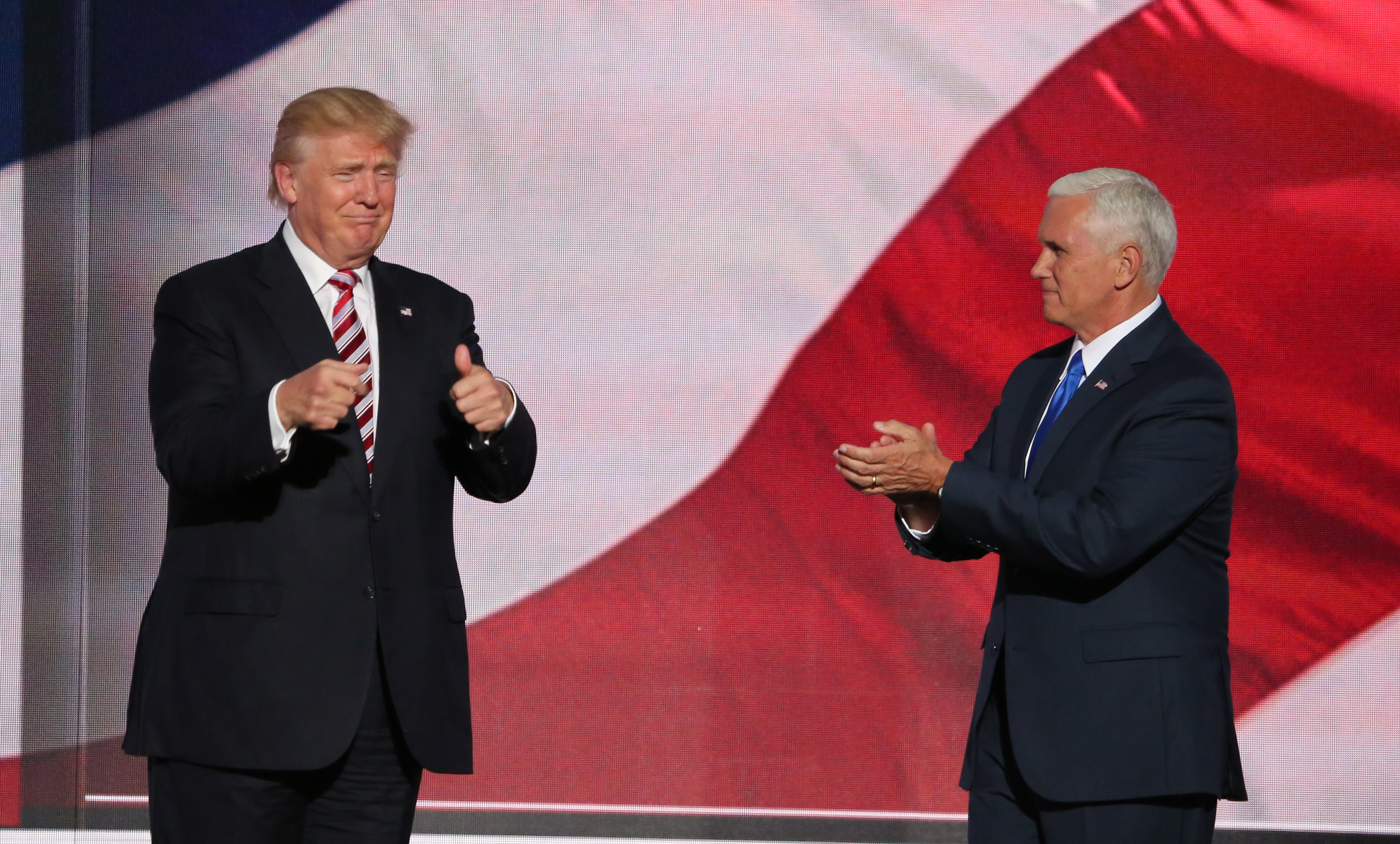
Candidate Trump and running mate Mike Pence at the Republican National Convention, July 2016

On July 15, 2016, Trump announced his selection of Indiana governor Mike Pence as his running mate. Four days later, the two were officially nominated by the Republican Party at the Republican National Convention. The list of convention speakers and attendees included former presidential nominee Bob Dole, but the other prior nominees did not attend.

On September 26, 2016, Trump and Clinton faced off in their first presidential debate, which was held at Hofstra University in Hempstead, New York. The second presidential debate was held at Washington University in St. Louis, Missouri. The beginning of that debate was dominated by references to a recently leaked tape of Trump making sexually explicit comments, which Trump countered by referring to alleged sexual misconduct on the part of Bill Clinton. Prior to the debate, Trump had invited four women who had accused Bill Clinton of impropriety to a press conference. The final presidential debate was held on October 19 at the University of Nevada, Las Vegas. Trump's refusal to say whether he would accept the result of the election, regardless of the outcome, drew particular attention, with some saying it undermined democracy.

=== Political positions ===
Trump's campaign platform emphasized renegotiating U.S.–China relations and free trade agreements such as NAFTA and the Trans-Pacific Partnership, strongly enforcing immigration laws, and building a new wall along the U.S.–Mexico border. His other campaign positions included pursuing energy independence while opposing climate change regulations such as the Clean Power Plan and the Paris Agreement, modernizing and expediting services for veterans, repealing and replacing the Affordable Care Act, abolishing Common Core education standards, investing in infrastructure, simplifying the tax code while reducing taxes for all economic classes, and imposing tariffs on imports by companies that offshore jobs. During the campaign, he also advocated a largely non-interventionist approach to foreign policy while increasing military spending, extreme vetting, or banning immigrants from Muslim-majority countries, in order to pre-empt domestic Islamic terrorism, and aggressive military action against the Islamic State. During the campaign, Trump repeatedly called NATO "obsolete".

His political positions have been described as populist, and some of his views cross party lines. For example, his economic campaign plan calls for large reductions in income taxes and deregulation, consistent with Republican Party policies, along with significant infrastructure investment, usually considered a Democratic Party policy. According to political writer Jack Shafer, Trump may be a "fairly conventional American populist when it comes to his policy views" but attracts free media attention, sometimes by making outrageous comments. Trump has supported or leaned toward varying political positions over time. Politico described his positions as "eclectic, improvisational and often contradictory", while NBC News counted "141 distinct shifts on 23 major issues" during his campaign.

=== Campaign rhetoric ===
In his campaign, Trump said he disdained political correctness; he also said the media had intentionally misinterpreted his words, and he made other claims of adverse media bias. In part due to his fame, and due to his willingness to say things other candidates would not, and because a candidate who is gaining ground automatically provides a compelling news story, Trump received an unprecedented amount of free media coverage during his run for the presidency, which elevated his standing in the Republican primaries.

Fact-checking organizations have denounced Trump for making a record number of false statements compared to other candidates. At least four major publications – Politico, The Washington Post, The New York Times, and the Los Angeles Times – have pointed out lies or falsehoods in his campaign statements, with the Los Angeles Times saying that "Never in modern presidential politics has a major candidate made false statements as routinely as Trump has". NPR said Trump's campaign statements were often opaque or suggestive.

Trump's penchant for hyperbole is believed to have roots in the New York real estate scene, where Trump established his wealth and where puffery abounds. Trump adopted his ghostwriter's phrase "truthful hyperbole" to describe his public speaking.

=== Support from the far right ===
According to Michael Barkun, the Trump campaign was remarkable for bringing fringe ideas, beliefs, and organizations into the mainstream. During his presidential campaign, Trump was accused of pandering to white supremacists. He retweeted open racists, and repeatedly refused to condemn David Duke, the Ku Klux Klan or white supremacists, in an interview on CNN's State of the Union, saying he would first need to "do research" because he knew nothing about Duke or white supremacists. Duke himself enthusiastically supported Trump throughout the 2016 primary and election, and has said he and like-minded people voted for Trump because of his promises to "take our country back". Trump was later reported to have praised Adolf Hitler to his chief of staff John Kelly, opining that "Hitler did a lot of good things," and also reportedly kept a volume of Hitler's speeches on his bedside cabinet when he was younger, and was often compared to Hitler in the media during his 2016 campaign. After repeated questioning by reporters, Trump said he disavowed David Duke and the KKK. Trump said on MSNBC's Morning Joe: "I disavowed him. I disavowed the KKK. Do you want me to do it again for the 12th time? I disavowed him in the past, I disavow him now."

The alt-right movement coalesced around Trump's candidacy, due in part to its opposition to multiculturalism and immigration. Members of the alt-right enthusiastically supported Trump's campaign. In August 2016, he appointed Steve Bannon – the executive chairman of Breitbart News – as his campaign CEO; Bannon described Breitbart News as "the platform for the alt-right". In an interview days after the election, Trump condemned supporters who celebrated his victory with Nazi salutes.

=== Financial disclosures ===
As a presidential candidate, Trump disclosed details of his companies, assets, and revenue sources to the extent required by the FEC. His 2015 report listed assets above $1.4 billion and outstanding debts of at least $265 million. The 2016 form showed little change.

Trump has not released his tax returns, contrary to the practice of every major candidate since 1976 and breaking his promise in 2014 to release them if he ran for office. He said his tax returns were being audited, and his lawyers had advised him against releasing them. Trump has told the press his tax rate was none of their business, and that he tries to pay "as little tax as possible".

In October 2016, portions of Trump's state filings for 1995 were leaked to a reporter from The New York Times. They show that Trump declared a loss of $916 million that year, which could have let him avoid taxes for up to 18 years. During the second presidential debate, Trump acknowledged using the deduction, but declined to provide details such as the specific years it was applied.

On March 14, 2017, the first two pages of Trump's 2005 federal income tax returns were leaked to MSNBC. The document states that Trump had a gross adjusted income of $150 million and paid $38 million in federal taxes. The White House confirmed the authenticity of the documents.

On April 3, 2019, the House Ways and means committee made a formal request to the Internal Revenue Service for Trump's personal and business tax returns from 2013 to 2018, setting a deadline of April 10. That day, Treasury secretary Steven Mnuchin said the deadline would not be met, and the deadline was extended to April 23, which also was not honored, and on May 6 Mnuchin said the request would be denied. On May 10, 2019, committee chairman Richard Neal subpoenaed the Treasury Department and the IRS for the returns and seven days later the subpoenas were defied. A fall 2018 draft IRS legal memo asserted that Trump must provide his tax returns to Congress unless he invokes executive privilege, contradicting the administration's justification for defying the earlier subpoena. Mnuchin asserted the memo actually addressed a different matter.

== First election to the presidency ==
2016 electoral vote results

On November 8, 2016, Trump received 306 pledged electoral votes versus 232 for Clinton. The official counts were 304 and 227 respectively, after defections on both sides. Trump received nearly 2.9 million fewer popular votes than Clinton, which made him the fifth person to be elected president while losing the popular vote. (Note: Records on this matter date from the year 1824. The number "five" includes the elections of 1824, 1876, 1888, 2000, and 2016. Despite their similarities, some of these five elections had peculiar results; e.g. John Quincy Adams trailed in both the national popular vote and the electoral college in 1824 (since no one had a majority in the electoral college, Adams was chosen by the House of Representatives), and Samuel Tilden in 1876 remains the only losing candidate to win an actual majority of the popular vote (rather than just a plurality).) Clinton was ahead nationwide with 65,853,514 votes (48.18%) to 62,984,828 votes (46.09%).

Trump's victory was considered a stunning political upset by most observers, as polls had consistently showed Hillary Clinton with a nationwide – though diminishing – lead, as well as a favorable advantage in most of the competitive states. Trump's support had been modestly underestimated throughout his campaign, and many observers blamed errors in polls, partially attributed to pollsters overestimating Clinton's support among well-educated and nonwhite voters, while underestimating Trump's support among white working-class voters. The polls were relatively accurate, but media outlets and pundits alike showed overconfidence in a Clinton victory despite a large number of undecided voters and a favorable concentration of Trump's core constituencies in competitive states.

Trump won 30 states, including the Rust Belt states of Michigan, Pennsylvania, and Wisconsin, which had been considered a blue wall of Democratic strongholds since the 1990s. Clinton won 20 states and the District of Columbia. Trump's victory marked the return of a Republican White House combined with control of both chambers of Congress.

Trump is the wealthiest president in U.S. history, even after adjusting for inflation, and at the time of his inauguration, the oldest person to take office as president. (Note: Joe Biden became the oldest president to take office in 2021.) He is also the first president who did not serve in the military or hold elective or appointed government office prior to being elected. Of the 43 (Note: Grover Cleveland was the 22nd and 24th president.) previous presidents, 38 had held prior elective office, two had not held elective office but had served in the Cabinet, and three had never held public office but had been commanding generals.

== Presidencies ==
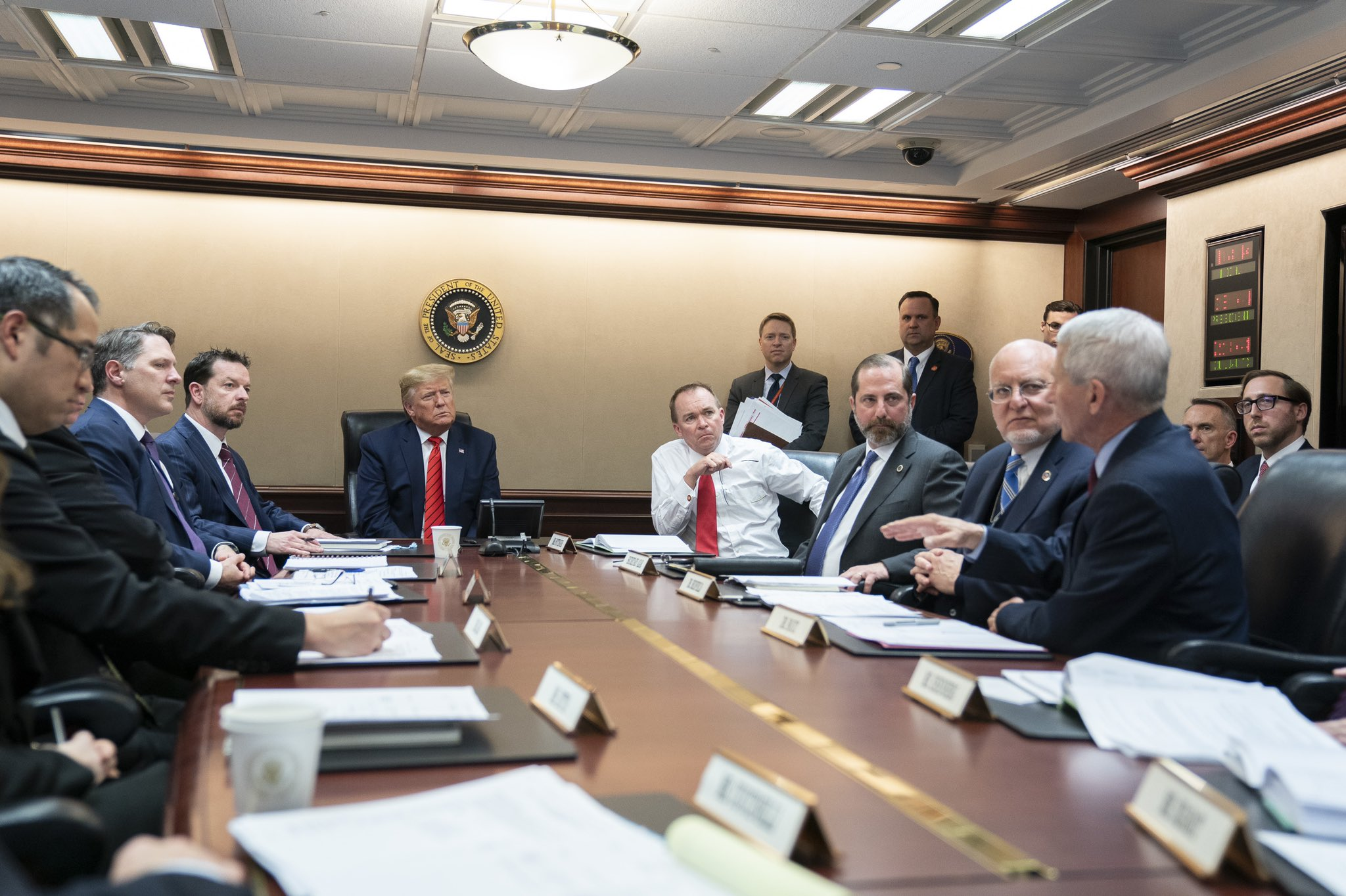
President Trump receives a briefing on COVID-19 in the White House Situation Room.

Expert scholarly analysis of Trump's first presidency by presidential historians has generally ranked Trump's tenure as among history's worst; for example, the first major scholarly survey on presidential rankings after he left office ranked Trump 41st out of 44, ahead of only James Buchanan, Andrew Johnson, and Franklin Pierce.

Donald Trump and his family received more than 100 gifts from foreign nations with net value of nearly $300,000, which they failed to explain. A House Oversight Committee report by the Democrats exposed the details of numerous gifts received by the Trump family. Saudi Arabia gave 16 gift items worth $45,000, while India gave 17 precious gift items worth $47,000. The Foreign Gifts and Decorations Act mandates the US president and his family to not receive gifts of more than $415 value. Besides, the expensive gifts are supposed to be disclosed and received on behalf of the US, and must be turned over to the National Archives.

== Protests ==
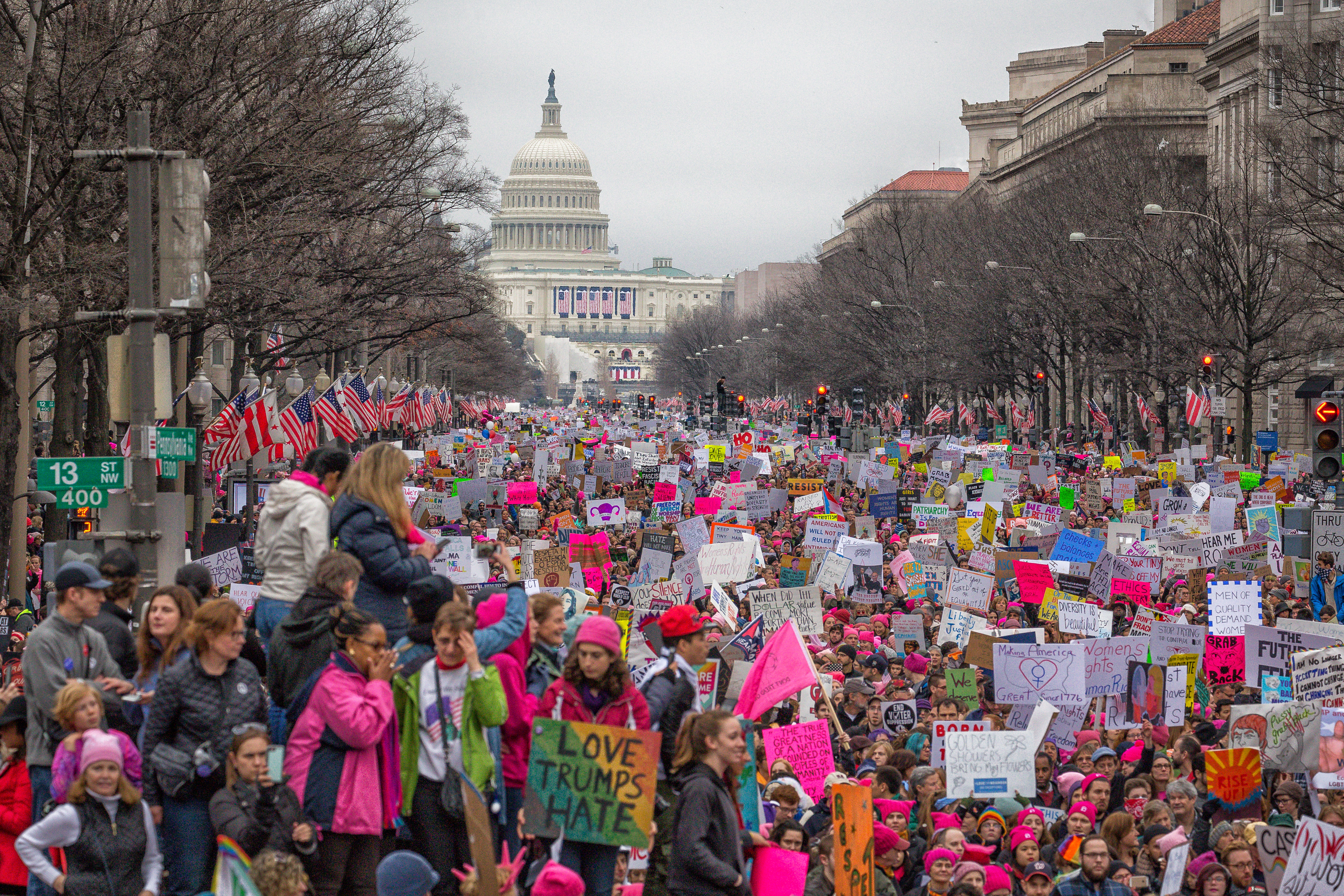
Women's March in Washington on January 21, 2017, a day after the inauguration

Some rallies during the primary season were accompanied by protests or violence, including attacks on Trump supporters and vice versa both inside and outside the venues. Trump's election victory sparked protests across the United States, in opposition to his policies and his inflammatory statements. Trump initially said on Twitter that these were "professional protesters, incited by the media", and were "unfair", but he later tweeted, "Love the fact that the small groups of protesters last night have passion for our great country."

In the weeks following Trump's inauguration, massive anti-Trump demonstrations took place, such as the Women Marches, which gathered 2,600,000 people worldwide, including 500,000 in Washington alone. Marches against his travel ban began across the country on January 29, 2017, just nine days after his inauguration.

== 2020 presidential campaign ==
Trump signaled his intention to run for a second term by filing with the FEC within a few hours of assuming the presidency. This transformed his 2016 election committee into a 2020 reelection one. Trump marked the official start of the campaign with a rally in Melbourne, Florida, on February 18, 2017, less than a month after taking office. By January 2018, Trump's reelection committee had $22 million in hand, and it had raised a total amount exceeding $67 million by December 2018. $23 million was spent in the fourth quarter of 2018, as Trump supported various Republican candidates for the 2018 midterm elections.

=== 2020 election defeat to Joe Biden ===
2020 electoral vote results

On November 3, 2020, Trump lost re-election to Democratic nominee and former vice president Joe Biden. Trump received 232 electoral votes to Biden's 306. Trump received 74,216,154 in the popular vote to Biden's 81,268,924.

== 2024 presidential campaign ==
=== Confirmation of intention to run for a second term ===
On November 15, 2022, at his Mar-a-Lago residence, one week after the 2022 midterm elections, Trump became the first major candidate to declare a campaign for the 2024 presidential election.

=== Confirmed Republican nominee ===
On 15 July 2024, the United States Republican Party selected Trump and JD Vance the party's nominees for president and vice president in the 2024 United States presidential election. Trump formally accepted the nomination on 19 July 2024.

=== Defeating Kamala Harris and winning a non-consecutive second presidential term ===
2024 electoral vote results

Trump went on to win the election held on 5 November 2024, defeating the Democratic nominee and incumbent Vice President Kamala Harris, and became the second US president in history to serve two non-consecutive terms after Grover Cleveland.

== See also ==
- Business career of Donald Trump
- Media career of Donald Trump

== Cited works ==
- Gallup, George Jr. (1990). The Gallup Poll: Public Opinion 1989. Rowman & Littlefield. ISBN 978-0-8420-2344-3.
- Kranish, Michael; Fisher, Marc (2017) [First published 2016]. Trump Revealed: The Definitive Biography of the 45th President. Simon & Schuster. ISBN 978-1-5011-5652-6.
- Trump, Donald J.; Schwartz, Tony (2009) [First published 1987]. Trump: The Art of the Deal. Random House. ISBN 978-0-446-35325-0.
