= Gerald S. McGowan =

American lawyer, wireless industry entrepreneur and diplomat

United States Ambassador to Portugal
- In office March 19, 1998 – July 3, 2001
- President: Bill Clinton
- Preceded by: Elizabeth Frawley Bagley
- Succeeded by: John N. Palmer

Personal details
- Born: Gerald Stephen McGowan; September 3, 1946 (age 79) Birmingham, Michigan, U.S.
- Party: Democratic
- Spouse(s): Sharon Shapiro; Susan Brophy
- Profession: Attorney

Gerald Stephen "Gerry" McGowan (born September 3, 1946 Birmingham, Michigan) is an American lawyer, wireless industry entrepreneur, and diplomat. He was appointed United States Ambassador to Portugal on November 10, 1997, and was sworn in by Vice President Al Gore. He presented his credentials in Lisbon, Portugal on March 19, 1998 and left his post on July 3, 2001.

== Life and career ==
McGowan was born and raised in Birmingham, Michigan to Harry and Mary McGowan, where he attended Brother Rice High School. While working towards his B.S. from Georgetown University and a J.D. degree from Georgetown Law, Gerry served as a clerk to Michigan Supreme Court Justice Thomas Kavanagh, and as an assistant to the late U.S. Senator Philip Hart. He also served in the Vietnam War as a United States Army 1st Lieutenant in 1970-1971. A classmate at Georgetown was then class President and eventual United States President, Bill Clinton.

McGowan is a career telecommunications industry lawyer and is a founding partner of the Washington D.C. law firm Lukas, McGowan, Nace & Gutierrez.

McGowan played an important role in negotiations between the US administration and the Portuguese leadership, during the East Timor struggle for independence from Indonesia in late 1999 and early 2000.

A telecommunications industry veteran, McGowan sat on the board of directors of Portugal Telecom from 2003-2015.

On June 1, 2015, McGowan was appointed by President Obama to the Board of Visitors of the United States Military Academy - West Point. McGowan also served as a visiting fellow at the Harvard Kennedy School's Institute of Politics in April, 2016.

== Family ==
He is the father of seven children, Jason, Zachary, Lukas, Connor, Molly, Sean and Dylan by his first wife, the former Sharon Shapiro, who died of breast cancer on April 8, 1995. He married Susan Brophy on January 10, 1998. They currently reside in Arlington, Virginia.

Diplomatic posts
Preceded by Elizabeth Frawley Bagley	United States Ambassador to Portugal; 1997–2001	Succeeded by John N. Palmer
