= List of current members of the United States Congress by wealth =

This list of members of the United States Congress by wealth includes the fifty richest members of Congress as of 2018. It displays the net worth (the difference between assets and liabilities) for the member and their immediate family, such as a spouse or dependent children. These figures offer only an estimation of wealth, as the Congressional financial disclosure rules use value ranges instead of exact amounts. As an upper range is not specified for values over $50 million (or over $1 million for a spouse), large assets are not represented accurately. Additionally, government salaries and personal residences are not typically included in disclosures. Furthermore, several members of Congress do not use a standardized electronic format, but instead file reports that range from vague to indecipherable. As of 2020, over half of the members of Congress were millionaires and the median net worth of members was approximately $1 million.

The original documents for each member's disclosure are publicly available on a database website, maintained by OpenSecrets.

Since 2009, the salaries per annum of members of the United States Congress have been as follows:

| Position | Salary |
|---|---|
| Speaker of the House of Representatives | $223,500 |
| Majority leader and minority leader of the House of Representatives | $193,400 |
| President pro tempore of the Senate | $193,400 |
| Senators and representatives | $174,000 |
| Non-voting members of the United States House of Representatives | $174,000 |

The wealthiest members of the United States Congress are as follows:

Source: OpenSecrets (2018 and 2019)
| Name | Party | State | Chamber | Net worth | Source of wealth |
|---|---|---|---|---|---|
| Jim Justice | Republican | West Virginia | Senate (since 2025) | $664.2 million | Owner of The Greenbrier, owner of several coal mines |
| Jefferson Shreve | Republican | Indiana | House (since 2025) | $599.8 million | Founder of Storage Express |
| Rick Scott | Republican | Florida | Senate (since 2019) | $503.2 million | Co-founder of HCA Healthcare, attorney |
| Darrell Issa | Republican | California | House (2001–2019, since 2021) | Up to $460 million | Former CEO of Directed Electronics |
| Kevin Hern | Republican | Oklahoma | House (since 2018) | $361.0 million | Owner of several McDonald's franchises, founder of KTAK Corporation, hog farm owner |
| Tim Sheehy | Republican | Montana | Senate (since 2025) | $297.06 million | Founder of Bridger Aerospace |
| Michael McCaul | Republican | Texas | House (since 2005) | $294 million | His father-in-law founded iHeartMedia |
| Nancy Pelosi | Democratic | California | House (since 1987) | $287 million | Investments |
| Dan Goldman | Democratic | New York | House (since 2023) | $64 to 253 million | Heir to Levi's |
| Mark Warner | Democratic | Virginia | Senate (since 2009) | $214.1 million | Early investor in Nextel, founder of Columbia Capital |
| Pete Ricketts | Republican | Nebraska | Senate (since 2023) | $206.39 million | Family owned TD Ameritrade, stake in the Chicago Cubs |
| Dave McCormick | Republican | Pennsylvania | Senate (since 2025) | $165.3 million | Former Co-CEO of Bridgewater |
| Vernon Buchanan | Republican | Florida | House (since 2007) | $157.2 million | Co-founder of American Speedy Printing, Honda distributor |
| April McClain Delaney | Democratic | Maryland | House (since 2025) | $152.7 million | Real estate investments, hedge fund holdings |
| Don Beyer | Democratic | Virginia | House (since 2015) | $124.9 million | Auto dealer |
| Jay Obernolte | Republican | California | House (since 2021) | $97.76 million | Former owner and director of FarSight Studios |
| Sara Jacobs | Democratic | California | House (since 2021) | $87.29 million | Her grandfather founded Qualcomm |
| Richard Blumenthal | Democratic | Connecticut | Senate (since 2011) | $85.2 million | Son-in-law of Peter L. Malkin |
| Suzan DelBene | Democratic | Washington | House (since 2012) | $79.4 million | Microsoft executive |
| Ron Johnson | Republican | Wisconsin | Senate (since 2011) | $78.5 million | Former CEO of Bemis Company |
| Doris Matsui | Democratic | California | House (since 2005) | $73.8 million | Her husband founded AES Corporation |
| Roger Williams | Republican | Texas | House (since 2013) | $66.9 million | His father's auto dealerships |
| Buddy Carter | Republican | Georgia | House (since 2015) | $66.5 million | Pharmacist, investments |
| Scott Peters | Democratic | California | House (since 2013) | $60.5 million | Attorney, economist, investments |
| Bernie Moreno | Republican | Ohio | Senate (since 2025) | $55.6 million | Auto dealer, investor in Ownum |
| Marlin Stutzman | Republican | Indiana | House (2010–2017, since 2025) | $54.3 million | Stake in a farm, owner of Stutzman Farms Trucking, his wife owns a tourist attraction |
| Bill Hagerty | Republican | Tennessee | Senate (since 2021) | $52.8 million | Investment firm director |
| Rick W. Allen | Republican | Georgia | House (since 2015) | $52.1 million | Founder of R.W. Allen and Associates |
| Robert Bresnahan | Republican | Pennsylvania | House (since 2025) | $48 million | Former CEO of Kuharchik Construction, owner of RPB Ventures |
| John Hoeven | Republican | North Dakota | Senate (since 2011) | $46.6 million | Shareholder in First Western Bank & Trust |
| Ro Khanna | Democratic | California | House (since 2017) | $45.7 million | Attorney, energy services executive |
| Jim Risch | Republican | Idaho | Senate (since 2009) | $41.8 million | Attorney, investments |
| Shri Thanedar | Democratic | Michigan | House (since 2023) | $40.9 million | Former owner of Chemir, founder of Avomeen |
| Maria Cantwell | Democratic | Washington | Senate (since 2001) House (1993–1995) | $40 million (peak, pre-2003) | Former Vice-President and shareholder in RealNetworks |
| Mitch McConnell | Republican | Kentucky | Senate (since 1985) | $34.1 million | Attorney, investments |
| Steve Daines | Republican | Montana | Senate (since 2015) | $32.9 million | Procter & Gamble executive |
| Dan Meuser | Republican | Pennsylvania | House (since 2019) | $31.7 million | Former President of Pride Corporation |
| Lloyd Doggett | Democratic | Texas | House (since 1995) | $29.7 million | Attorney, investments |
| Chellie Pingree | Democratic | Maine | House (since 2009) | $28.58 million | Ex-wife of financier Donald Sussman |
| Brad Schneider | Democratic | Illinois | House (2013–2015, since 2017) | $27.2 million | Management consultant, industrial engineer |
| French Hill | Republican | Arkansas | House (since 2015) | Up to $25.7 million | Financial services executive |
| John Rose | Republican | Tennessee | House (since 2019) | $23.3 million | Co-founder of Transcender Corporation |
| Dan Newhouse | Republican | Washington | House (since 2015) | $21.2 million | Farmer |
| Ralph Norman | Republican | South Carolina | House (since 2017) | $20.6 million | Construction executive |
| Cynthia Lummis | Republican | Wyoming | Senate (since 2021) House (2009–2017) | $20 to 75 million (peak in 2007) | Real estate holdings, cryptocurrency, co-owner of Hammond Hardware Company |

== See also ==
- List of richest American politicians
- Stop Trading on Congressional Knowledge Act
