= Kris M. Balderston =

American diplomat

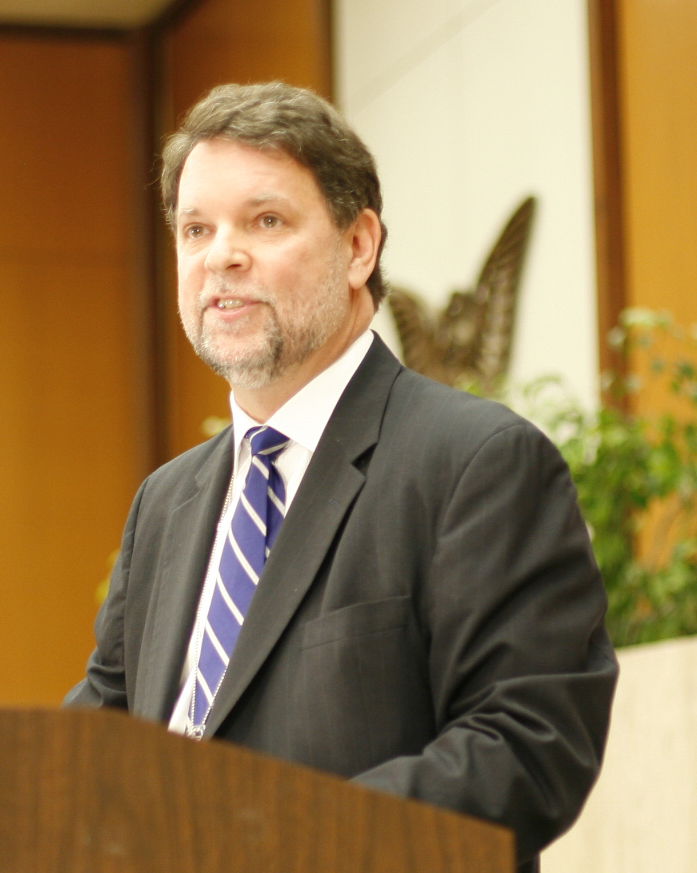
Kris Balderston delivering remarks at the Global Impact Economy Forum, 2012

Kris M. Balderston is General Manager of the FleishmanHillard Washington, DC office. His career has included work for the White House, U.S. Senate, and State Department.

Previously, he served as the Secretary's Special Representative for Global Partnerships and managed the Global Partnership Initiative in the Office of the Secretary of State. Prior to his role at the United States Department of State, Balderston was Senator Hillary Clinton's first legislative director in January 2001, before serving as her Deputy Chief of Staff from 2002 to 2009.

Balderston began his career with the National Governors' Association and then ran the Massachusetts State Office for Governor Michael Dukakis from 1987 to 1991. He became Senior Policy Advisor to Senate Majority Leader George Mitchell at the Senate Democratic Policy Committee from 1991 to 1993. From 1993 to 1995, he served as the Deputy Chief of Staff at the Department of Labor under Secretary of Labor Robert Reich. Kris served in the White House under Bill Clinton from 1995 to 2001, as Special Assistant to the President for Cabinet Affairs and then later as the Deputy Assistant to the President and the Deputy Secretary to the Cabinet.

Balderston holds a Bachelor of Arts in political science from Le Moyne College and a Master of Arts in government from Georgetown University.
