= Smith Bagley =

American businessman (1935–2010)

Finance Vice Chair of the Democratic National Committee
- In office 1975–1979

Personal details
- Born: April 1, 1935 New York City, US
- Died: January 2, 2010 (aged 74) St. Simons Island, Georgia, US

Smith Walker Bagley (April 1, 1935 – January 2, 2010) was an American businessman, Democratic fundraiser and party executive, and socialite. He was an heir to the R. J. Reynolds Tobacco fortune, and was married to US Ambassador Elizabeth Frawley Bagley.

== Early life and personal life ==
Smith Bagley was born in New York to Nancy Susan Reynolds, the daughter of R. J. Reynolds, and Henry Walker Bagley, a businessman from Greenwich, Connecticut. He was a graduate of Washington and Lee University.

Bagley had homes in the Massachusetts towns of Georgetown and Nantucket, and also owned the Reynolds family estate, Musgrove on St. Simons Island. The family estate was the site of Jimmy Carter's first pre-inauguration meeting, and was later a regular retreat for Democratic policymakers and activists.

Bagley first married Sandra Peabody Robinson, however, the relationship later ended in divorce.

In 1966, he married Vicki Lynn Ladmer, whom he also later divorced.

He married Elizabeth Frawley Bagley, the daughter of Judge John D. Frawley and Rosemary Frawley, nearly twenty years his junior, in 1983.

== Career ==
Bagley joined the Democratic Party at age 17, and unsuccessfully ran for a seat in the North Carolina State House of Representatives in 1968. Bagley later served as finance vice chair of the Democratic National Committee from 1975 to 1979.

Bagley joined the U.S. Army Reserve in his twenties, eventually reaching the rank of captain.

Bagley was a supporter of Jimmy Carter in 1976, and campaigned for him. He was a member of the board of the John F. Kennedy Center for the Performing Arts, after being appointed by Jimmy Carter.

In 1989, Bagley founded Smith Bagley Inc. (SBI), trading as Cellular One of North East Arizona, and served as an executive until his death. His family are the co-owners of SBI.

In the 1990s, Bagley worked with Terry McAuliffe to create the first database of Democratic Party members. Bagley and his wife fundraised the maximum $600,000 for President Obama's inauguration from 2008 to 2009.

=== Philanthropy ===
Bagley was the longest-serving trustee of the Z. Smith Reynolds Foundation, serving for 50 years, and as the organization's president 1971 to 1975 and from 1983 to 1987.

In 1987, Bagley founded the Brenn Foundation, a public policy 501(c)(3) non-profit. He served as president of the Arca Foundation in the 1980s. His daughter Nicole Bagley now serves as the president of both the Brenn and Arca foundations.

== Scandals ==
=== Washington Group Inc. scandal ===
In early 1977, Bagley was indicted on federal charges of stock manipulation and conspiracy. The government alleged that between 1974 and 1975, Bagley and four others manipulated the stock of Washington Group Inc., a textile and food conglomerate in Winston-Salem, North Carolina, which Bagley was president of. The company went bankrupt in 1977. Bagley and the others were acquitted on August 2, 1979.

Later, in 1980, Bagley settled a civil lawsuit with the U.S. Securities and Exchange Commission, for artificially inflating the company's stockprice, for an unknown amount.

=== Scott Wallace South Africa Ambassadorial appointment scandal ===
In 2008, Bagley recommended Scott Wallace, an heir to former Vice President Henry Wallace, to be Ambassador to South Africa to Barack Obama. Wallace asked for the ambassadorial appointment himself at Bagley's urging. WikiLeaks leaked the emails and communications about Wallace's potential appointment in 2008, causing a small scandal, and Wallace did not receive the appointment as a result.

== Death ==
Smith Bagley died at Suburban Hospital after suffering from a stroke at his home on St. Simons Island in Georgia on January 2, 2010, at the age of seventy-four.
