= List of presidents of the United States by net worth =

The list of presidents of the United States by net worth at peak varies greatly. Debt and depreciation often means that presidents' net worth is less than $0 at the time of death. Most presidents before 1845 were extremely wealthy, especially Andrew Jackson and George Washington; their wealth was derived from extensive land holdings and slaves. There has never been a property qualification for the presidency or other federal offices, but, in the early years of the republic, there were property qualifications for voting or for some of the stepping-stone offices to the presidency, particularly governorships.

The two Roosevelts, John F. Kennedy, and Donald Trump were parties to extensive family fortunes. Several other presidents married into substantial fortunes. Presidents since 1929, when Herbert Hoover took office, have generally been wealthier than presidents of the late nineteenth and early twentieth centuries; Hoover was born into poverty but became a multimillionaire (perhaps $100 million in 2022 dollars) due to his mining interests. Lyndon B. Johnson was born quite poor, but he and his wife were ultimately millionaires (perhaps $100 million in today's money) due to the LBJ Holding Company owning radio and television stations and two banks, as well as owning the LBJ Ranch.

All presidents since 1929 have been millionaires. These presidents have often received income from autobiographies and other writing. Except for Franklin D. Roosevelt and John F. Kennedy (both of whom died while in office), all presidents beginning with Calvin Coolidge have written autobiographies. In addition, many presidents—including Bill Clinton—have earned considerable income from public speaking after leaving office.

Harry S. Truman claimed to struggle financially after his leaving of office, with a net worth considerably less than $1 million. His appeals to Congress contributed to the doubling of the presidential salary to $200,000 in 1949. In addition, the presidential pension was created in 1958 when Truman again said he was experiencing financial difficulties. Harry and Bess Truman received the first Medicare cards in 1966 via the Social Security Act of 1965. A 2021 investigation by Paul Campos showed that Truman was financially comfortable throughout his life, with an inflation-adjusted net worth of about $6.6 million after he left office, including $2 million that he misappropriated from an expense account at the beginning of his first full term.

== List of presidents by peak net worth ==
Net worth over time of Donald Trump, believed to be the wealthiest US president

The figures in the table below are all derived from 24/7 Wall St.'s 2016 valuation of each president's peak net worth. For purposes of 24/7 Wall St.'s valuation, a president's peak net worth may occur before or after that president has left office. To allow for a direct comparison, most of the figures have been adjusted for inflation to 2022 U.S. dollars except for the Donald Trump figure.

Name	Net worth (millions of 2022 US$)	Political party	Years in office	Lifespan
Donald Trump	6,500 (Note: Trump has claimed to be worth up to $10 billion, but his financial disclosure and campaign statements vary. Forbes estimated his net worth at $7.1 billion in 2024.)	Republican	2017–2021; 2025–present	born 1946
George Washington	539	None/Independent	1789–1797	1732–1799
Thomas Jefferson	284	（Democratic-）Republican	1801–1809	1743–1826
Bill Clinton	245	Democratic	1993–2001	born 1946
Theodore Roosevelt	168	Republican	1901–1909	1858–1919
Andrew Jackson	159	Democratic	1829–1837	1767–1845
James Madison	136	（Democratic-）Republican	1809–1817	1751–1836
Lyndon B. Johnson	115	Democratic	1963–1969	1908–1973
Herbert Hoover	100	Republican	1929–1933	1874–1964
John F. Kennedy	100	Democratic	1961–1963	1917–1963
Franklin D. Roosevelt	79	Democratic	1933–1945	1882–1945
Barack Obama	70	Democratic	2009–2017	born 1961
John Tyler	68	Whig/None	1841–1845	1790–1862
George W. Bush	50	Republican	2001–2009	born 1946
James Monroe	36	（Democratic-）Republican	1817–1825	1758–1831
Martin Van Buren	34	Democratic	1837–1841	1782–1862
Grover Cleveland	33	Democratic	1885–1889; 1893–1897	1837–1908
George H. W. Bush	31	Republican	1989–1993	1924–2018
John Quincy Adams	27	（Democratic-）Republican	1825–1829	1767–1848
John Adams	25	Federalist	1797–1801	1735–1826
Richard Nixon	20	Republican	1969–1974	1913–1994
Ronald Reagan	16	Republican	1981–1989	1911–2004
James K. Polk	13	Democratic	1845–1849	1795–1849
Dwight D. Eisenhower	10	Republican	1953–1961	1890–1969
Joe Biden	10	Democratic	2021–2025	born 1942
Gerald Ford	9	Republican	1974–1977	1913–2006
Jimmy Carter	9	Democratic	1977–1981	1924–2024
Zachary Taylor	8	Whig	1849–1850	1784–1850
William Henry Harrison	7	Whig	1841	1773–1841
Benjamin Harrison	7	Republican	1889–1893	1833–1901
Harry S. Truman	6.6	Democratic	1945–1953	1884–1972
Millard Fillmore	5	Whig	1850–1853	1800–1874
Rutherford B. Hayes	3	Republican	1877–1881	1822–1893
William Howard Taft	3	Republican	1909–1913	1857–1930
Franklin Pierce	2	Democratic	1853–1857	1804–1869
William McKinley	1	Republican	1897–1901	1843–1901
Warren G. Harding	1	Republican	1921–1923	1865–1923
James Buchanan	<1	Democratic	1857–1861	1791–1868
Abraham Lincoln	<1	Republican/National Union	1861–1865	1809–1865
Andrew Johnson	<1	Democratic/National Union	1865–1869	1808–1875
Ulysses S. Grant	<1	Republican	1869–1877	1822–1885
James A. Garfield	<1	Republican	1881	1831–1881
Chester A. Arthur	<1	Republican	1881–1885	1829–1886
Woodrow Wilson	<1	Democratic	1913–1921	1856–1924
Calvin Coolidge	<1	Republican	1923–1929	1872–1933

== See also ==
- List of richest American politicians
