= International Women's Democracy Center =

The International Women's Democracy Center is a non-profit organization based in Washington D.C., United States, established in 1995 to strengthen women's global leadership through education, networking and research with a focus on increasing the role of women in politics, policy and decision-making within their own governments.

The organization is headed by President and Founder Barbara Ferris, a former Peace Corps Women in Development Director. IWDC qualified for Consultative Status to the UN Economic and Social Council (ECOSOC) in 2001, thus providing IWDC with up to 5 passes to any UN Conference around the world.

== Projects ==
IWDC's projects include the United Nations Youth Delegate Program, political advocacy workshops for Israeli and Palestinian women, and the Pipeline Project.

The United Nations Youth Delegate Program (UNYDP) is a youth leadership program that mentors young women from Cuyahoga County, Ohio and prepares them for careers in global public service, international trade, foreign affairs and diplomacy through experiential learning at the United Nations. Since 2002, the program has been implemented on a bi-annual basis. Three high-school seniors from Magnificat High School in Cleveland attend the UN Commission on the Status of Women in the spring and the UN Department of Public Information - Non-Governmental Organization Briefing in the fall. The students pay their own expenses and are chaperoned to New York by a teacher from Magnificat.

IWDC hosts the Pipeline Project which trains women ages 18–35 across the United States to become leaders in their own communities. 2-day Pipeline workshops have been held in Philadelphia (2005), Cleveland (2006), Dallas (2006) and Raleigh-Durham (2008).

IWDC facilitates the Community Advocate Mentor Program which trains women peace activists from regions moving from conflict to co-existence. For five years, IWDC trained women from Northern Ireland in partnership with the Northern Ireland Women's European Union in an effort to strengthen the public policy, lobbying and advocacy skills of 100 leaders from all sectors of the community. Based on the success of the CAMP – NI program which began in Belfast with pre-departure training from NIWEU and culminated with two weeks of intensive hands-on training in Washington, DC, IWDC reorganized the program for Israel and Palestine. THE CAMP - ME program initiated in 2007. However, due to organizational difficulties, funding troubles and the dissolution of an original partnership with an Israeli/Palestinian non-profit, the program downsized to only 10 women in DC for one week in late 2008.

In 2004, IWDC hosted a two-week program in Botswana called the Southern Africa Women's Leaders Project (SAWLP). The Emang Basadi Women's Association, a local women's organization, worked with IWDC to train women in community outreach to address local issues.

== Media coverage ==
IWDC has been featured in Newsday, The University of Connecticut's The Daily Campus, Ohio State Alumni Magazine, Irish News, Georgetown's The Georgetown Current, and AARP.

== See also ==
- Haifa Women's Coalition
