= Microsoft Dynamics 365 =

Microsoft software

- Developer: Microsoft
- Release: November 1, 2016; 10 years ago
- Operating system: Microsoft Windows
- Type: Enterprise resource planning and customer relationship management
- License: Proprietary software
- Website: www.microsoft.com/en-us/dynamics-365

Microsoft Dynamics 365 is a set of enterprise accounting and sales software products. Its flagship product, Dynamics GP, is based on Great Plains Dynamics, which was released in 1993.

== Applications ==
Microsoft Dynamics 365 largely consists of products developed by companies that Microsoft acquired: Dynamics GP (formerly Great Plains Software), Dynamics NAV (formerly Navision; now forked into Dynamics 365 Business Central), Dynamics SL (formerly Solomon), and Dynamics AX (formerly Axapta; now forked into Dynamics 365 Finance and Operations). The various products are aimed at different market segments, ranging from small and medium-sized businesses (SMBs) to large organizations with multi-language, currency, and legal entity capability. In recent years Microsoft Dynamics ERP has focused its marketing and development on software as a service (SaaS) products.

Microsoft Dynamics 365 contains 12 applications:

- Dynamics 365 Sales – Sales Leaders, Sales Operations
- Dynamics 365 Customer Insights
- Dynamics 365 Customer Service – Customer Service Leaders, Customer Service Operations
- Dynamics 365 Contact Center
- Dynamics 365 Field Service
- Dynamics 365 Supply Chain Management – Streamline planning, production, stock, warehouse, and transportation
- Dynamics 365 Commerce
- Dynamics 365 Finance – Finance Leaders
- Dynamics 365 Project Operations – Operation Leaders
- Dynamics 365 Human Resources – Attract, Onboard, Core HR
- Dynamics 365 Sustainability
- Dynamics 365 Business Central – ERP for SMBs

=== Sales ===
Dynamics 365 Sales
- Developer: Microsoft
- Release: 2003; 23 years ago
- Stable release: Dynamics 365 / February 2018; 8 years ago
- Operating system: Windows 10, 11
- Available in: Multilingual
- Type: Customer relationship management
- License: Shareware
- Website: www.microsoft.com/en-us/dynamics-365/products/sales

Dynamics 365 Sales is a customer relationship management (CRM) software package developed by Microsoft. The current version is Dynamics 365. The name and licensing changed with the update from Dynamics 2016. 365 Sales comes with softphone capabilities.

=== Field Service ===
Dynamics 365 Field Service
- Release: May 2, 2016; 10 years ago

Stable release(s) [±]
- Back end platform: 8.8.150.63 / October 30, 2026; 16 days ago
- Windows: August 2026 Update (3.26082.6) / August 2026; 3 months ago
- Operating system: Windows 10, 11; Android 11+; iOS 16+; web
- Type: Field service management
- Website: www.microsoft.com/en-us/dynamics-365/products/field-service

Dynamics 365 Field Service is a field service management (FSM) app built in Microsoft Power Platform that integrates with Microsoft Teams, Microsoft Copilot, Microsoft Outlook and Bing Maps. The app allows building workflows for different profiles within a FSM company, such as supervisor (or manager), dispatcher and technician.

In July 2015, Microsoft acquired FieldOne Systems. Its FieldOne Sky software served as the basis for Dynamics 365 Field Service, which was launched on May 2nd, 2016.

==== Use cases ====
The following workflow example works for a heating, ventilation, and air conditioning (HVAC) company in which technicians need to travel to customers' premises in order to fix problems.

At the higher end, Field Service searches Teams for calls, Outlook for emails and Dynamics 365 for internet of things (IoT) alerts related to the business' customers and creates work orders for each finding. For instance, after receiving an email, a supervisor can use Field Service's Outlook extension to pre-populate a work order with the email content.

Through its Copilot plug-in, a supervisor can receive a summary of created work orders or see all of them in the Field Service Teams app and assign a technician for each work order. For each technician, the app shows their speciality, working time and booked travel time.

In the Dynamics 365 web app, a dispatcher is able to see the schedule assigned by the supervisor for each technician in a Gantt chart and arrange it in order to optimize their daily time capacity. The travel time for a technician between each work order is visible. In the web app, both the supervisor and the dispatcher can edit work orders and change their priority, incident type, status, etc. The web app also provides dashboard analytics for work orders, time to completion, etc.

Through Field Service's mobile app for Android or iOS, a technician sees the work orders assigned and the addresses and directions (provided by Bing Maps) for each customer facility. Additionally, a checklist of required inventory can be filled for each work order. With the Copilot integration, the chatbot can be used to summarize work orders. Upon arriving at the customer's premises, the technician is able to follow a task list provided by the supervisor or dispatcher in order to fix the problem.

Guides by incident type can be created beforehand to help the technician with the problem. In Teams, a technician may start a video call with the "Spacial Annotations" feature in order to receive help from a specialist. After solving the problem, Copilot can be used to update the work order and mark it as finished (the same action can be done manually with the mobile app).

=== Finance ===
Microsoft Dynamics 365 for Finance and Operations Enterprise Edition (formerly Microsoft Dynamics AX) – ERP and CRM software-as-a-service product meant for mid-sized and large enterprises. Integrating both Dynamics AX and Dynamics CRM features, consisting of the following modules: for Financials and Operations, for Sales Enterprise, for Marketing, for Customer Service, for Field Service, for Project Service Automation. It is designed to be easily connected with Office 365 and Microsoft Power BI.

==== Microsoft Dynamics ax ====
Microsoft Dynamics AX was one of Microsoft's Enterprise resource planning (ERP) software products. In 2018, its thick-client interface was removed and the web product was rebranded as Microsoft Dynamics 365 for Finance and Operations as a part of the Dynamics 365 suite. MDCC or Microsoft Development Center Copenhagen was once the primary development center for Dynamics AX. Microsoft Dynamics AX contained 19 core modules:

===== Traditional core (since axapta 2.5) =====
- General ledger – ledger, sales tax, currency, and fixed assets features
- Bank management – receives and pays cash
- Customer relationship management (CRM) – business relations contact and maintenance (customers, vendors, and leads)
- Accounts receivable – order entry, shipping, and invoicing
- Accounts payable – purchase orders, goods received into inventory
- Inventory management – inventory management and valuation
- Master planning (resources) – purchase and production planning
- Production – bills of materials, manufacturing tracking
- Store, manage, and interpret data.

===== Extended core =====
The following modules are part of the core of AX 2009 (AX 5.0) and available on a per-license basis in AX 4.0:

- Shop floor control
- Cost accounting
- Balanced scorecards
- Service management
- Expense management
- Payroll management
- Environmental management

===== Morphx and x++ =====
X++ integrates SQL queries into standard Java-style code.

===== Presence on the internet =====
Information about Axapta prior to the Microsoft purchase was available on technet.navision.com, a proprietary web-based newsgroup, which grew to a considerable number of members and posts before the Microsoft purchase in 2002.

After Microsoft incorporated Axapta into their Business Solution suite, they transferred the newsgroup's content to the Microsoft Business Solutions newsgroup. The oldest Axapta Technet post that can be found dates to August 2000.

===== Events =====
Extreme Conferences: extreme365 is a conference for the Dynamics 365 Partner Community which now includes Dynamics AX, featuring an Executive Forum.

===== Personalization and predictive analytics =====
At the National Retail Federation (NRF) Conference 2016 in New York, Microsoft unveiled its partnership with Infinite Analytics, a Cambridge-based predictive analytics and personalization company.

== Microsoft Dynamics 365 Business Central ==
Microsoft Dynamics 365 Business Central

- Screenshot of the October 2018 release, North American edition
- Developer: Microsoft
- Release: April 2, 2018; 8 years ago
- Stable release: Version 20 / April 2022; 4 years ago
- Platform: Primarily cloud-based
- Predecessor: Microsoft Dynamics NAV, Navision
- Available in: Multilingual
- Type: Enterprise resource planning
- License: Proprietary software
- Website: dynamics.microsoft.com/en-us/business-central/overview/

Microsoft Dynamics 365 Business Central (formerly Microsoft Dynamics NAV) – ERP and CRM software-as-a-service product meant for small and mid-sized businesses. Integrating both Dynamics NAV and Dynamics CRM features, consisting of the following modules: for Financials and Operations, for Sales Professionals, for Marketing. Easily connected with Office 365 and Microsoft Power BI.

- Microsoft Dynamics 365 Customer Engagement (formerly Microsoft CRM). Microsoft Dynamics 365 Customer Engagement contains modules to interact with customers: Marketing, Sales, Customer Service, Field Service. The Customer Service is a module used to automate customer service processes providing performance data reports and dashboards.

=== Online and on-premises deployment ===
The Dynamics 365 Business Central system comes in both an online hosted (SaaS) version and an on-premises version for manual deployment and administration.

Some features, such as integration with other online Microsoft services, are not available in the on-premises version and only in the online edition.

=== Localization ===
As an international ERP system, Business Central is available with 24 official localizations to work with the local features and requirements of various countries. Local partners provide an additional 47 localizations.

The system is compliant with various internal financial standards to meet local requirements, such as GDPR, IAS/IFRS and SOX.

=== Editions and licensing ===
There are two editions of Business Central, Essentials and Premium. Essentials covers Finance, Sales, Marketing, Purchasing, Inventory, Warehousing, and Project Management. Premium includes all of Essentials functionality plus Service Management and Manufacturing features.

With the arrival of NAV 2013, Microsoft introduced a new licensing model that operated on a concurrent user basis. With this model, user licenses were of two types: A full user or a limited user. The full user has access to the entire system, whereas the limited user only has read access to the system and limited write access.

From the Business Central rebrand launch, the licensing model changed to a per-seat license model with a 3x concurrent seat multiplier added to any existing perpetual licenses from previous Dynamics NAV versions. Customers with a Dynamics NAV Extended Pack license were moved to the Premium edition.

=== Value-Added Resellers (VARs) ===
Business Central is primarily distributed and implemented through Microsoft’s global network of Value-Added Resellers (VARs) and Independent Software Vendors (ISVs). VARs provide services such as consulting, implementation, customization, integration, training, and ongoing support. Because Business Central is highly extensible, VARs frequently tailor deployments to meet the specific requirements of industries such as manufacturing, distribution, retail, professional services, and field service.

ISVs supplement the core product by offering add-on applications and extensions through Microsoft AppSource. These extensions expand Business Central’s capabilities in areas such as reporting, payroll, manufacturing execution, commerce, document management, and integrations with third-party systems. Together, VARs and ISVs enable Business Central to support a wide range of industry and regional scenarios while maintaining a standardized cloud platform.

==== Examples of Value-Added Resellers (VARs) ====
Microsoft Dynamics 365 Business Central is supported by an international network of authorized partners. Examples of recognized VARs that provide implementation, customization, and support services include:

- Sabre Limited – A North American partner specializing in manufacturing-focused Business Central implementations, including engineer-to-order, configure-to-order, and job shop environments. Sabre Limited also offers training, support, and industry-specific consulting services.
- ArcherPoint – A global partner providing Business Central and Dynamics NAV consulting, development, and managed services across retail, manufacturing, and distribution sectors.
- Innovia Consulting – A long-established Business Central/NAV partner specializing in cloud migration, ERP implementations, and support for distribution, manufacturing, and service organizations.
- Encore Business Solutions – A Canadian and U.S.-based Microsoft partner delivering Business Central, CRM, Power Platform, and Azure implementations across multiple industries.
- Western Computer – A Business Central and Dynamics 365 integrator focused on distribution, rental, and manufacturing industry solutions.
- Sikich – A global technology and professional services firm that offers Business Central implementations along with broader digital transformation consulting.
- Clients First Business Solutions – A U.S.-based ERP partner delivering Business Central implementations for manufacturing, distribution, and professional services, including multi-entity and multi-location environments.
- The NAV People (TNP) – A major UK-based partner known for Business Central/NAV training, support, and large-scale ERP deployments.

These partners often supplement Business Central with industry-specific extensions, integrations, or custom development depending on customer requirements and local regulations.

== History ==
Microsoft Dynamics was a line of Business Applications, containing enterprise resource planning (ERP) and customer relationship management (CRM). Microsoft marketed Dynamics applications through a network of reselling partners who provided specialized services. Microsoft Dynamics formed part of "Microsoft Business Solutions". Dynamics can be used with other Microsoft programs and services, such as SharePoint, Yammer, Office 365, Azure and Outlook. The Microsoft Dynamics focus-industries are retail, services, manufacturing, financial services, and the public sector. Microsoft Dynamics offers services for small, medium, and large businesses.

=== Business Central ===
Business Central was first published as Dynamics NAV and Navision, which Microsoft acquired in 2002.

==== Navision ====
Navision originated at PC&C A/S (Personal Computing and Consulting), a company founded in Denmark in 1984. PC&C released its first accounting package, PCPlus, in 1985—a single-user application with basic accounting functionality. There followed in 1987 the first version of Navision, a client/server-based accounting application that allowed multiple users to access the system simultaneously. The success of the product prompted the company to rename itself to Navision Software A/S in 1995.

The Navision product sold primarily in Denmark until 1990. From Navision version 3 the product was distributed in other European countries, including Germany and the United Kingdom.

In 1995 the first version of Navision based on Microsoft Windows 95 was released.

In 2000, Navision Software A/S merged with fellow Danish firm Damgaard A/S (founded 1983) to form NavisionDamgaard A/S. In 2001 the company changed its name to "Navision A/S".

On July 11, 2002, Microsoft bought Navision A/S to go with its previous acquisition of Great Plains Software. Navision became a new division at Microsoft, named Microsoft Business Solutions, which also handled Microsoft CRM.

In 2003 Microsoft announced plans to develop an entirely new ERP system (Project Green). But it later decided to continue development of all ERP systems (Dynamics AX, Dynamics NAV, Dynamics GP and Dynamics SL). Microsoft launched all four ERP systems with the same new role-based user interface, SQL-based reporting and analysis, SharePoint-based portal, Pocket PC-based mobile clients and integration with Microsoft Office.

==== Dynamics NAV ====
In September 2005, Microsoft re-branded the product and re-released it as Microsoft Dynamics NAV.

In December 2008, Microsoft released Dynamics NAV 2009, which contains both the original "classic" client, as well as a new .NET Framework-based three-tier GUI called the RoleTailored Client (RTC).

In first quarter of 2014 NAV reached 102,000 current customers.

In 2016, Microsoft announced the creation of Dynamics 365 — a rebranding of the suite of Dynamics ERP and CRM products as a part of a new online-only offering. As a part of this suite, the successor to NAV was codenamed "Madeira".

==== Dynamics 365 Business Central ====
In September 2017 at the Directions conference, Microsoft announced the new codename "Tenerife" as the next generation of the Dynamics NAV product. This replaced codename "Madeira".

On April 2, 2018, Business Central was released publicly and plans for semi-annual releases were announced.

Business Central introduced a new AL language for development and translated the codebase from Dynamics NAV (C/AL).

=== Dynamics SL, Dynamics GP, Dynamics C5 ===
Several variants of the Dynamics brand have migration paths to Business Central with most having not had a new release since 2018. The later releases of the SL, GP, and C5 products adopted the Dynamics NAV Role-Tailored Client UI which helped pave the transition to the Business Central product.

Legacy Dynamics products and their support end dates
Product	Last major release	Support lifecycle end date
Dynamics SL	2018	July 11, 2028
Dynamics GP	2018 R4 (Nov 2021)	January 11, 2028
Dynamics C5	2016	April 14, 2026

==== History of Dynamics C5 ====
Dynamics C5 was developed in Denmark as the successor to the DOS-based Concorde C4. The developing company Damgaard Data merged with Navision in 2001 which was subsequently acquired by Microsoft Microsoft in 2002 rebranding the solution from Navision C5 to Microsoft Dynamics C5.

The product handles currently more than 70,000 installations in Denmark.

==== History of Dynamics SL ====
Microsoft Dynamics SL Connector

Based in Findlay, Ohio, Solomon's roots go back more than 35 years, when co-founders Gary Harpst, Jack Ridge and Vernon Strong started TLB, Inc. in 1980. TLB, Inc. stands for The Lord's Business, "to remind the founders why the business was started: to conduct the business according to biblical principles." TLB was later renamed Solomon Software, and then Microsoft Dynamics SL.

==== History of Dynamics GP ====
The Dynamics GP product was originally developed by Great Plains Software, an independent company located in Fargo, North Dakota run by Doug Burgum. Dynamics Release 1.0 was released in February 1993. It was one of the first accounting packages in the United States that were designed and written to be multi-user and to run under Windows as 32-bit software. In late 2000, Microsoft announced the purchase of Great Plains Software. This acquisition was completed in April 2001.

Dynamics GP is written in a language called Dexterity. Previous versions were compatible with Microsoft SQL Server, Pervasive PSQL, Btrieve, and earlier versions also used C-tree, although after the buyout all new versions switched entirely to Microsoft SQL Server databases.

Dynamics GP will no longer be updated after September 2029, with security updates through April 2031.

=== Finance ===
Microsoft Dynamics 365 Finance is a Microsoft enterprise resource planning (ERP) system for medium to large organizations. The software, part of the Dynamics 365 product line, was first on general release in November 2016, initially branded as Dynamics 365 for Operations. In July 2017, it was rebranded to Dynamics 365 for Finance and Operations. At the same time, Microsoft rebranded their business software suite for small businesses (Business Edition, Financials) to Finance and Operations, Business Edition, however, the two applications are based on completely different platforms. Its history includes:

- 1998 (March) – Axapta, a collaboration between IBM and Danish Damgaard Data, released in the Danish and US markets.
- 2000 – Damgaard Data merged with Navision Software A/S to form NavisionDamgaard, later named Navision A/S. Released Axapta 2.5. IBM returned all rights in the product to Damgaard Data shortly after the release of Version 1.5.
- 2002 – Microsoft acquires Navision A/S. Released Axapta 3.0.
- 2006 – Released Microsoft Dynamics AX 4.0.
- 2008 – Released Microsoft Dynamics AX 2009.
- 2011 – Released Microsoft Dynamics AX 2012. It was made available and supported in more than 30 countries and 25 languages. Dynamics AX is used in over 20,000 organizations of all sizes, worldwide.
- 2016 – Released Microsoft Dynamics AX 7. Later rebranded to Dynamics 365 for Operations. This update was a major revision with a completely new UI delivered through a browser-based HTML5 client, and initially only available as a cloud-hosted application. This version lasted only a few months, though, as Dynamics AX was rebranded Microsoft Dynamics 365 for Operations in October 2016, and once more as Dynamics 365 for Finance and Operations in July 2017.
- 2017 – Rebranded to Dynamics 365 for Finance and Operations, Enterprise Edition (not to be mistaken with Dynamics 365 for Finance and Operations Business Edition, which is based on former Microsoft Dynamics NAV).
- 2018 – Rebranded to Dynamics 365 for Finance and Operations
- 2018 – The Human Resources Module became Dynamics 365 for Talent, now Dynamics 365 Human Resources.
- 2020 – Rebranded and split into two products:
  - Dynamics 365 Finance
  - Dynamics 365 Supply Chain Management
- 2023 – Dynamics 365 Human Resources re-integrated

=== Sales ===
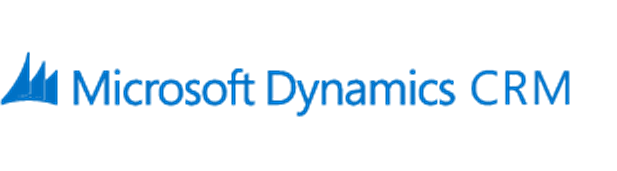
Old Microsoft Dynamics CRM logo

Microsoft Dynamics 365 Sales has undergone several iterations over its history.

==== Microsoft CRM 1.2 ====
Microsoft CRM 1.2 was released on December 8, 2003. Microsoft CRM 1.2 was not widely adopted by industry.

It was not possible to create custom entities but there was a software development kit (SDK) available using SOAP and XML endpoints to interact with it.

==== Microsoft Dynamics CRM 3.0 ====
The second version was rebranded as Microsoft Dynamics 3.0 (version 2.0 was skipped entirely) to signify its inclusion within the Dynamics product family and was released on December 5, 2005. Notable updates over version 1.2 are the ease of creating customizations to CRM, the switch from using Crystal Reports to Microsoft SQL Reporting Services, and the ability to run on Windows Vista and Outlook 2007.

Significant additions released later by Microsoft also allowed Dynamics CRM 3.0 to be accessed by various mobile devices and integration with Siebel Systems. This was the first version that saw reasonable take up by customers.

You could create custom entities and (1xN) relations between the system/custom entities.

==== Microsoft Dynamics CRM 4.0 ====
Dynamics CRM 4.0 (a.k.a. Titan) was introduced in December 2007 (RTM build number 4.0.7333.3 Microsoft CRM build numbers from version 4.0 to version 8). It features multi-tenancy, improved reporting security, data importing, direct mail merging and support for newer technologies such as Windows Server 2008 and SQL Server 2008 (Update Rollup 4).

Dynamics CRM 4.0 also implements CRM Online, a hosted solution that is offered directly by Microsoft. The multi-tenancy option also allows ISVs to offer hosted solutions to end customers as well.

Dynamics CRM 4.0 is the first version of the product, which has seen significant take up in the market and passed the 1 million user mark in July 2009.

Additional support for NxN relations was added, which solved a lot of 'in-between' entities. "Connections" were also introduced in favour of "Relations". The UI design was based on Office 2007 look and feel, with the same blue shading and round button as "start".

==== Microsoft Dynamics CRM 2011 ====
Dynamics CRM 2011 was released to open Beta in February 2010. It then went into Release Candidate stage in December 2010. The product was then released in February 2011 (build number 5.0.9688.583)

Browsers such as Internet Explorer, Chrome and Firefox browsers are fully supported since Microsoft Dynamics CRM 2011 Update Rollup 12. Because of this browser compatibility R12 was highly anticipated but also caused a lot of stress for customers that had used unsupported customizations. R12 broke those customizations and clients had to rethink their changes. Microsoft offered additional wizards to pinpoint the problems.

==== Microsoft Dynamics CRM 2013 ====
Dynamics CRM 2013 was released to a closed beta group on July 28, 2013. Dynamics CRM 2013 Online went live for new signups in October 2013. It was released in November 2013 (build number 6.0.0000.0809).

==== Microsoft Dynamics CRM 2015 ====
On September 16, 2014, Microsoft announced that Microsoft Dynamics CRM 2015, as well as updates to its Microsoft Dynamics CRM Online and Microsoft Dynamics Marketing services, will be generally available in the fourth quarter of 2014. Microsoft also released a preview guide with details.

On November 30, 2014, Microsoft announced the general availability of Microsoft Dynamics CRM 2015 and the 2015 Update of Microsoft Dynamics Marketing.

On January 6, 2015, Microsoft announced the availability of a CRM Cloud service specifically for the US Government that is designed for FedRAMP compliance.

==== Microsoft Dynamics CRM 2016 ====
Microsoft Dynamics CRM 2016 was officially released on November 30, 2015. Versions for CRM 2016 was 8.0, 8.1 and 8.2. With version 8.2 the name, Microsoft Dynamics CRM 2016, was changed to Dynamics 365

Microsoft Dynamics CRM 2016 was officially released on November 30, 2015. It includes advancements in intelligence, mobility and service, with significant productivity enhancements. In June 2016 was developed a special application which sends scanned info from business cards into MS Dynamics CRM named Business Card Reader for MS Dynamics and Call Tracker application in 2017.

==== Microsoft Dynamics 365 sales ====
Microsoft Dynamics 365 was officially released on November 1, 2016, as the successor to Dynamics CRM. The product combines Microsoft business products (CRM and ERP Dynamics AX). A softphone dialer can be added as an extension.

The on-premises application, called Dynamics 365 Customer Engagement contained the following applications:

- Dynamics 365 for Sales
- Dynamics 365 for Customer Service
- Dynamics 365 for Marketing
- Dynamics 365 for Field Service
- Dynamics 365 for Project Service Automation

The offerings Dynamics 365 for Finance and Operations cover the ERP needs, such as bookkeeping, invoice and order handling and manufacturing.

In Dynamics 365 version 9.0.0.1 many notable features like Virtual entities in Dynamics 365, Auto Numbering Attributes, Multi Select Options sets etc. were introduced.

== Product updates ==
=== October 2018 update ===
The update released in October 2018 included new features for sales, marketing, customer service, and recruitment.

=== April 2019 update ===
This update was released on April 5, 2019. The features added after the update, included a user interface (UUI) to embed canvas apps created in PowerApps and it also brought back the tabs facility. The update also led to the removal of the Xrm.Page.data.

=== February 2020 update ===
An update was announced on February 19, 2019. The update included additions to the Customer Insights, Microsoft's customer data platform (CDP) such as new first and third-party data connections. In addition to this, this update brought forth new sales forecasting tools and Dynamics 365 Sales Engagement Center. The Dynamics 365 Project Operations was introduced in this update.

=== October 2021 update (wave 1) ===
An update was announced on October 5, 2019. This update included a replacement of bank reconciliation reports. The payment reconciliation journal was improved to support preview posting, separate number series, and user-defined document numbers. Microsoft Dynamics 365 also welcomes Correct Dimensions action. With this update, Microsoft Dynamics 365 has welcomed integration with Microsoft Teams search box, Microsoft Word, and Microsoft Universal Print technology.

== Support and end of life ==
Version	Release date	End of mainstream support	End of extended support
Microsoft CRM 1.2	October 31, 2003	January 9, 2007	—N/a
Microsoft Dynamics CRM 3.0	December 1, 2005	April 12, 2011	April 12, 2016
Microsoft Dynamics CRM 4.0	February 29, 2008	April 9, 2013	April 10, 2018
Microsoft Dynamics CRM 2011	May 18, 2011	July 12, 2016	July 13, 2021
Microsoft Dynamics CRM 2013	January 12, 2014	January 8, 2019	January 9, 2024
Microsoft Dynamics CRM 2015	February 11, 2015	January 14, 2020	January 14, 2025
Microsoft Dynamics CRM 2016	November 30, 2015	January 12, 2021	January 13, 2026
Microsoft Dynamics 365	November 1, 2016	(follows Microsoft Modern Lifecycle Policy)	

== Related products ==
Microsoft Dynamics includes a set of related products:

- Microsoft Dynamics Management Reporter. Management Reporter is a financial reporting and analysis application. Its main feature is to create income statements, balance sheet statements, cash flow statements and other financial reports. Reports can be stored in a centralized Report Library along with external supporting files. Security on reports and files may be controlled using Windows Authentication and SQL Server.
- Microsoft Dynamics for Retail (formerly Microsoft Dynamics RMS, QuickSell 2000 and Dynamics POS)
- Microsoft Dynamics for Marketing (formerly MDM and MarketingPilot 2012)
- Microsoft Dynamics Social Listening (formerly Netbreeze 2013)
- Power Automate, formerly Microsoft Flow (until 2019), a toolkit similar to IFTTT for implementing business workflow products.
- Power Automate Desktop, robotic process automation software for automating graphical user interfaces (acquired in May 2020)
- Parature customer engagement software in the customer support and service channels (acquired in January 2014)

Microsoft also sells Sure Step as an implementation methodology for Microsoft Dynamics for its re-sellers.

In July 2018, Microsoft announced Dynamics 365 AI for sales applications.

== See also ==
- Microsoft Azure
- Microsoft Dataverse
- Microsoft Office
- Microsoft Power Platform
- List of Microsoft software
