= Office of Global Partnerships =

United States Department of State office

- Seal of the United States Department of State

Agency overview
- Formed: 2008; 18 years ago
- Jurisdiction: Executive branch of the United States
- Agency executive: Thomas Debass, Managing Director
- Parent department: U.S. Department of State
- Website: www.state.gov/bureaus-offices/under-secretary-for-economic-growth-energy-and-the-environment/office-of-global-partnerships/

The Office of Global Partnerships (E/GP) is a small office within the U.S. Department of State reporting to the Under Secretary of State for Economic Growth, Energy, and the Environment. Launched in 2008 by Secretary of State Condoleezza Rice, it self-describes as serving as "the entry point for collaboration between the U.S. Department of State, the public and private sectors, and civil society".
