= Great Plains Software =

Accounting software company (1981–2001)

Great Plains Software, Inc.
- Type: Public
- Traded as: Nasdaq: GPSI
- Industry: Information technology
- Founded: 1981; 45 years ago
- Founder: Joseph Larson
- Defunct: 2001
- Fate: Acquired by Microsoft
- Headquarters: Fargo, North Dakota
- Area served: United States
- Key people: Doug Burgum (president); Joseph Larson (director)
- Number of employees: 2,200
- Website: greatplains.com at the Wayback Machine (archived 2000-08-28)

Great Plains Software, Inc. was an accounting software company located in Fargo, North Dakota, whose products focused on small to medium-sized businesses. It was founded in 1981, went public in 1997, and was sold to Microsoft in 2001. Prior to its acquisition, it had 2,200 employees.

== History ==
The company was founded in 1981 by Joseph Larson, who also served as the company's first president. Doug Burgum, who later went on to become a future Governor of North Dakota and United States Secretary of the Interior, joined the company in March 1983 as a shareholder. Burgum provided seed capital for the company; he bought out its other investors in early 1984 and became its new president. Larson continued to serve as a company director until its acquisition.

The company grew to about 170 employees by 1987, and had around 290 employees by 1989. PC Magazine in 1993 said "Its reputation for outstanding support and customer relations leads the industry". Great Plains earned about $300 million in annual sales and had its IPO in 1997, after using the Internet to help it expand beyond North Dakota. In 1999 the company acquired Match Data Systems, a development team in the Philippines. In 2000, after several layoffs, it announced its acquisition by Microsoft for $1.1 billion. The purchase was completed in 2001.

Its products were rebranded "Microsoft Dynamics GP" in 2005, part of Microsoft Dynamics 365 as of 2016.
