= VRChat =

Virtual reality social platform

- Developer: VRChat Inc.
- Publisher: VRChat Inc.
- Designers: Graham Gaylor; Jesse Joudrey
- Engine: Unity
- Platforms: Microsoft Windows, Android, iOS (on Meta Quest 2 and newer, PICO 4, and HTC Vive XR Elite)
- Release: Microsoft Windows, Oculus Rift; January 16, 2014; Steam; February 1, 2017; HTC Vive; September 13, 2017; Oculus Quest; December 11, 2018; PICO 4; November 9, 2023; Android & iOS; October 24, 2025
- Genre: Massively multiplayer online
- Modes: Single-player, multiplayer

VRChat is an online virtual world platform created by Graham Gaylor and Jesse Joudrey and operated by VRChat, Inc. The platform allows users to interact with others with user-created 3D avatars and worlds. VRChat is designed primarily for use with virtual reality headsets, being available for Microsoft Windows PCs and as an app for Android-based headsets such as Meta Quest, Pico 4, and HTC Vive XR Elite. VRChat is also playable without a virtual reality device in a desktop mode designed for a mouse and keyboard, gamepad, or mobile app for touchscreen devices.

VRChat was first released as a Windows application for the Oculus Rift DK1 prototype on January 16, 2014. It was later released to the Steam early access program on February 1, 2017. VRChat later became available on the Meta Quest store on December 11, 2018, and in early access on Google Play on August 22, 2023, then was fully released on the App Store and Google Play store on October 24, 2025.

== Overview ==
Players in VRChat

VRChat's functionality is similar to that of games such as Second Life and Habbo Hotel, allowing users to access user-developed "worlds" where they can interact with each other using virtual avatars. Worlds can vary, with some taking the form of social spaces, performance venues, and games.

VRChat is also capable of running in "desktop mode" without a VR headset, which is controlled using either a mouse and keyboard, gamepad, or touchscreen device. Some limitations exist in desktop mode, such as the inability to freely move an avatar's limbs, or perform interactions that require more than one hand. A feature known as "Selfie Expression" allows limited motion tracking using a webcam.

The paid VRChat Plus (VRC+) subscription provides extra features such as more slots for "favorite" avatars, profile pictures, and the ability to attach an in-game photo to an invite request. Other exclusive features for subscribers have been added since launch, including additional theming options for the user interface, and custom emojis and stickers. In March 2025, several new Plus-exclusive features were launched in beta, including a virtual dolly for the in-game camera, and a flyable camera drone, and Selfie Expression (which later became available to all users in September of that year).

=== User-generated content ===
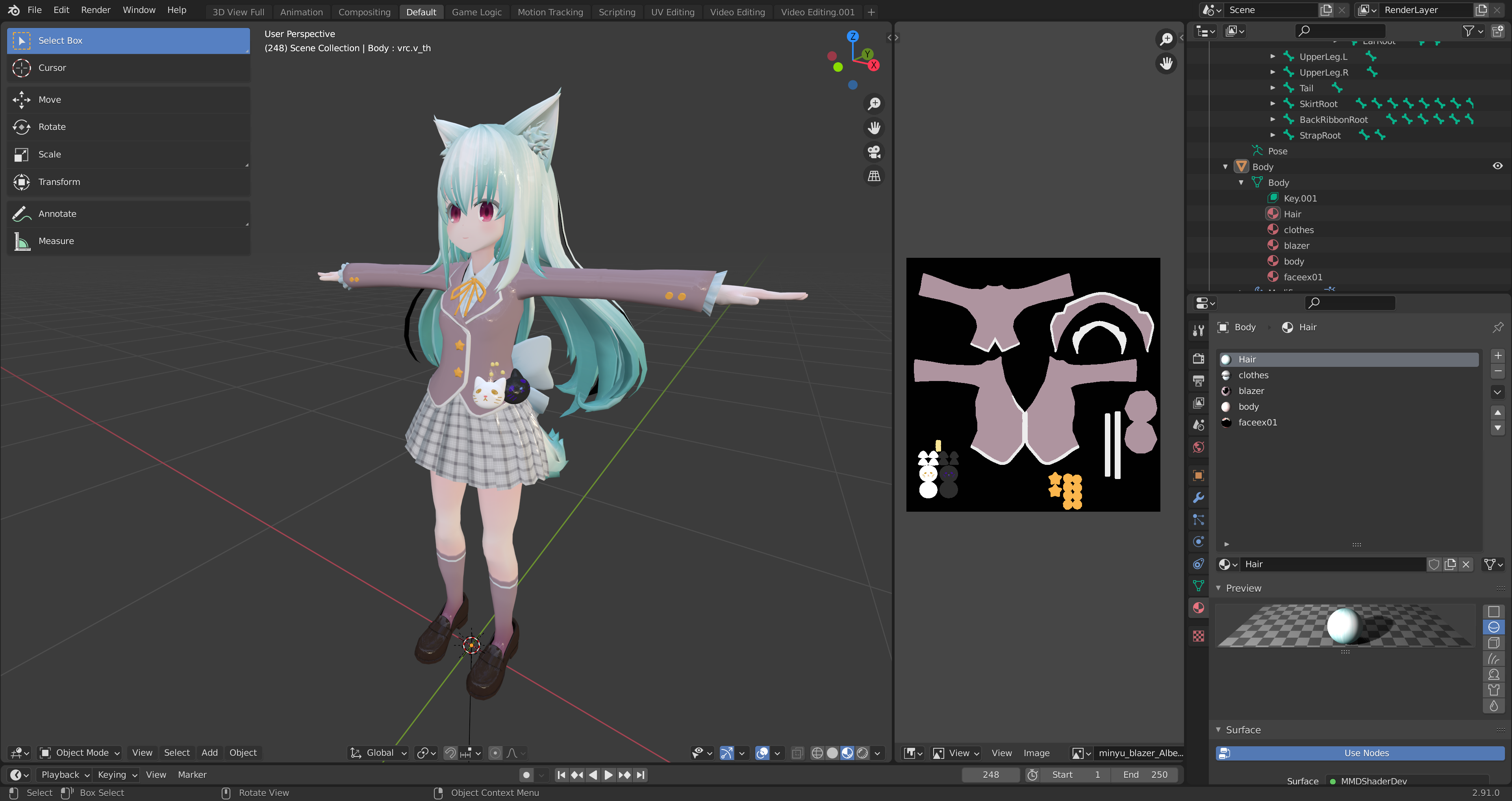
A VRChat avatar open for editing in the 3D modeling software Blender

Creating avatars and worlds is an involved process using external tools; they are uploaded by users of a Unity software development kit released alongside VRChat. Avatars are capable of mimicking head and hand motion along with supporting lip syncing, eye tracking, blinking, and other features. Trends and variations of avatars can spread deeply through the community, and avatars themselves are often distributed for free, or sold through online marketplaces such as Gumroad or Booth.

In 2020, VRChat introduced Udon, a visual programming language which uses a node graph system. While still considered alpha software, it became usable on publicly-accessible worlds beginning in April 2020. A source-to-source compiler known as UdonSharp allows scripts to be written against the Udon APIs in C#. Later in 2022, VRChat began to implement a secondary application—"VRChat Creator Companion" (VCC)—for managing Unity IDE installations, projects, and packages using a Unity Package Manager (UPM)-compatible format. The previous VRChat SDK2 was deprecated in February 2023, with the Udon-based SDK 3.x becoming mandatory for all new content going forward.

In 2022, support for the Open Sound Control (OSC) protocol was added for more advanced interactions with external software and devices.

In May 2023, VRChat announced that it would add microtransactions using a digital currency known as "VRChat Credits". Credits are used for systems known as the "Creator Economy", which allows groups to offer subscriptions that can allow access to exclusive features programmed into their worlds (such as VIP rooms or in-game cosmetics) for supporters. 50% of revenue from subscriptions go to the group owner. In May 2025, a related feature known as the "Avatar Marketplace" was also announced, allowing users to purchase access to premium public avatars using Credits; at launch, this included officially licensed avatars such as Quill from Moss.

In October 2026, VRChat held a public survey to solicit feedback on the labeling and filtering of content developed with the assistance of generative artificial intelligence. Following the survey, the service stated that it planned to explore changes to improve world discoverability (including adding a likes/dislikes system, and expanding metadata to include support for multiple images, attribution of "tools used", and a label for content that was not developed using gen AI), but did not commit to including filtering options for worlds based on use of AI. The service cited that despite the majority of respondents supporting some form of AI labeling and/or filtering, there was no clear consensus among the respondents as to which method to use, and concerns were raised that labeling could be abused to fraudulently conceal AI-generated content as being non-AI, or encourage harassment of users for their usage or non-usage of AI (including "sleuthing" behavior). The decision faced criticism from members of the VRChat community, who perceived the response as ignoring the survey's consensus in support of some form of AI labelling and/or filtering.

=== Hardware support ===
VRChat supports Microsoft Windows (PC), Android, and iOS platforms. Content such as worlds and avatars can be built for one or more platforms to support cross-platform play; due to hardware limitations, content for mobile platforms must be optimized within specific constraints.

VRChat supports major PC virtual reality platforms such as Meta Quest (via Quest Link or streaming apps such as Virtual Desktop) and SteamVR (including the HTC Vive and Valve Index among others). There are two versions of VRChat for mobile devices; one is designed for Android-based standalone VR headsets, including Meta Quest 2 and newer (support for the original Oculus Quest ended in 2023), Pico 4, and HTC Vive XR Elite. Mobile app versions of VRChat for Android and iOS exited beta in October 2025; these versions utilize touchscreen controls, and offer access to social features and push notifications from groups.

Finger tracking and gesture recognition is supported on controllers such as the Index Controller and Oculus Touch, allowing users' finger movements to be reflected by their avatar, and hand poses to trigger linked animations (such as a corresponding facial expressions). VRChat also supports SteamVR and OSC full-body tracking for motion capture, including tracker peripherals utilizing SteamVR base stations (i.e. HTC Vive Trackers), inertial measurement unit (IMU)-based trackers such as SlimeVR and Sony Mocopi (the latter being compatible with the Android standalone version of VRChat, and with the PC version via a SlimeVR plugin), and Kinect among others. The Vive XR Elite version of VRChat supports the Vive Ultimate Tracker accessory.

== Community ==
VRChat's popularity has been attributed to use by YouTubers and Twitch streamers. VRChat has spawned media such as a weekly newspaper in its forums, and talk shows and podcasts dedicated to a discussion of the game. After an initial wave of viral popularity upon its release, the platform saw a steady increase in concurrent users with the onset of the COVID-19 pandemic and direct quarantine policies. There were recorded spikes in viewership of VRChat-related Twitch streams in mid-2020 and September 2020. The service reported a record of over 24,000 concurrent users over the Halloween weekend (with over half using it on a VR platform), spurred by holiday events and the recent release of the Oculus Quest 2. On December 31, 2020, the service recorded a then-record of over 40,000 concurrent users for New Year's Eve, to the point that it experienced a major outage around midnight ET due to a security provider having mistaken the surge as a denial-of-service attack. By 2025, it was reported by VRChat staff that the platform regularly averaged around 120,000 concurrent users on weekends. A concurrent user record was set on New Year's Eve 2025–26, peaking at nearly 149,000 users around midnight CT on January 1, 2026, and a "surprisingly high" figure of Japanese users.

VRChat Content Creator [Great Moon Aroma]

The platform has a notable community of transgender users, as the use of avatars have allowed individuals to discover and portray an expression of themselves that suits their gender identity, especially if they live in regions where the transgender community faces prejudice. Trans Academy—a support group for transgender users on VRChat—has over 58,000 members in their VRChat group as of June 2026.

The virtual furry convention Furality has been hosted on VRChat since 2020; its ninth edition in 2025—Furality Somna—hosted a record of over 26,000 registered attendees, and raised over $109,000 for the Orlando, Florida-based LGBTQ+ charity The Center.

The Japanese company Hikky has organized a series of events on VRChat known as Vket (Virtual Market), a virtual doujinshi convention focused on the sale of digital assets by members of the community. The event also features areas with sponsored booths, which have featured exhibitors such as Bandai Namco, Disney, East Japan Railway Company, and HP. Sanrio has similarly organized the Sanrio VFes, which has featured exhibitions of its characters, environments inspired by the Sanrio Puroland theme park, and virtual concert events. On February 15, 2026, the premiere of a promotional virtual concert for the anime film Cosmic Princess Kaguya! held as part of Sanrio VFes contributed to a new concurrent user record of around 156,700.

=== Moderation and trust system ===
VRChat is user moderated with a votekick system. When a problematic user is present, anyone may initiate a vote to remove them from the area. User-created groups may post written social rules and expectations within spaces that they operate, and assign moderators to enforce these rules.

Users of VRChat are automatically classified into various "trust ranks" based on factors such as the time they spend on the platform, number of friends, and content uploaded. Higher ranks come with increased access to avatar features that may be disruptive if misused. The classification of users into an ordered ranking system, based on an opaque algorithm, may lead to discrimination or stereotyping based on trust rank.

=== Performing arts ===
The platform has attracted various music-oriented communities and events; dancers have leveraged full-body tracking support to give virtual performances and classes within VRChat, including ballet, breaking, and pole dance.

Online dance music events have also occurred on VRChat, especially since the COVID-19 pandemic. They are organized by collectives and groups that develop and design nightclub worlds, and sometimes simulcast their events on live streaming platforms such as Twitch. One club—Loner Online—was noted by an NME writer for its attention to detail in recreating an underground club experience (with the Akihabara nightclub Mogra cited by its developers as an influence), right down to having bathroom stalls. In partnership with the VRChat-based electronic music festival SlyFest, British drum and bass producer Muzz organized a virtual concert tour consisting of headlining appearances at multiple VRChat events in 2021 (including support from other producers such as Feint, Mollie Collins, and Teddy Killerz), and would later establish a club group of his own known as Sanctum.

In June 2020, French electronic musician Jean-Michel Jarre presented a virtual concert experience in VRChat, "Alone Together". On December 31, 2020, Jarre presented a second virtual concert for New Year's Eve, "Welcome to the Other Side", which was broadcast across other radio, television, and online platforms from outside of the Notre-Dame cathedral, and featured an interactive companion experience on VRChat taking place within a virtual version of the cathedral.

Users have produced short films within VRChat, leveraging features such as its built-in camera functionality, as well as third-party camera tools such as VRCLens (which provides additional functions and effects not provided by the built-in camera, such as filters, focal length, zebra patterning, and drone cameras). The Raindance Film Festival has incorporated VRChat content into its Raindance Immersive event highlighting virtual and extended reality experiences, while several documentaries have been produced about VRChat itself, such as We Met in Virtual Reality (2022).

=== Sign language ===
Signed language is possible in VRChat because users can position their hands anywhere they can reach, and pose their fingers to varying extents. Two sign dialects are used depending on the signer's hardware; both must be understood for effective communication. The general dialect is limited to seven predetermined handshapes built into VRChat; signing compatibility was not a priority when these handshapes were selected. Some specialized avatars may expand on this limitation, especially by replacing the horns sign (1I) with the more broadly useful shaka sign (Y). (Note: The remaining gestures are: 1, 5, 10, L, S, V.) The other dialect is for users of the Valve Index controllers, which track each finger independently.

Neither dialect can correctly reproduce all signs, so Deaf users alter them in standardized ways. For example, to imply that two fingers are meant to be crossed, a twisting motion is added to the sign. Altered signs must also account for the lack of eye and face tracking, (Note: Although VRChat avatars can support face tracking, its adoption is limited because support must be built into the avatars, and because the tracking hardware is not commercially available.) which is a major obstacle to accurately recreating sign languages. In addition to these hardware dialects, the Quest 2's camera-based hand tracking can also be used for sign language but can have problems with signs where one hand occludes the other from the view of the cameras, or where a hand is brought too close to the face.

The Helping Hands VRChat Community is a group focused on teaching sign language and promoting awareness of Deaf culture to the VRChat population. Community volunteers organize educational and social events where participants can learn sign language and interact with Deaf and signing community members. The community's VRChat group has over 5,000 members and hosts different events each week.

=== Social mutes ===
Within the VRChat community, it is not considered unusual or rude for an individual to stay silent at most or all times. These users, called "mutes" in a non-derogatory context, have meaningful social interactions through expressive gesticulation or writing and are unlikely to speak even when asked repeatedly. Silence as a social norm makes it easier for active participation by users with social anxiety, muteness including selective mutism, gender dysphoria and deafness.

Within VRChat, pens are widely available and can often be used to write in mid-air.

Mutes are strongly integrated into the culture of VRChat. Social spaces are often fitted with communication tools catering to them, such as pens and keyboards. They also benefit from prevalent sign language materials. Despite this, mute communication is often more challenging than vocal communication. Mutes are not universally accepted and may be harassed or ignored by some speaking users.

Mutes are the subject of a social trend whereby speaking users "adopt" them, and refer to them as their "personal mute" or "my mute". Mutes might seek adoption because their chaperone could mediate and include them in vocal social spaces. The practice has been controversial because it may infantilize or objectify the adoptees (who have been compared to pets or Pokémon) or surrender too much social control over them.

A 2025 study of social media posts by VRChat mutes (n=324) classified their stated reasons for not speaking: 26.6% mentioned that they were muted due to their voice not matching their avatar; 35.8% due to social anxiety; 13.9% as a strategy to avoid harassment; and 12.7% due to disabilities.

== Funding ==
In September 2026, Pixiv Inc. announced that it had made an undisclosed investment in VRChat to capitalize on its Japanese userbase; the company is the owner of Booth, which has served as a prominent storefront for user-created assets for VRChat.

== Controversies ==
=== Use by minors ===
In February 2022, a BBC News report accused the service of not providing enough safeguards to prevent minors from entering worlds that may contain adult themes and interactions. In September 2023, VRChat added a "content gating" system that allows avatars and worlds to be tagged by users for containing adult themes, suggestive content, violence, and/or extreme horror; by default, all flagged content is blocked for users whose profiles declare that they are under the age of 18. For users over the age of 18, filters are turned off by default, and may be customized based on user preferences.

In November 2024, it was announced that VRChat would be adding support for opt-in age verification, which allows users to restrict access to instances to those verified as being 18 years of age or older. This feature utilizes the third-party identity verification provider Persona, and was trialed initially among selected communities before becoming widely available to VRC+ subscribers in January 2025.

=== Prohibition of client modifications ===
On July 25, 2022, VRChat announced that it would implement Easy Anti-Cheat (EAC) in order to protect against prohibited modifications to the client. The announcement specifically cited griefers using mods designed to crash other users out of VRChat sessions, as well as issues with alleged account hijacking. The announcement led to widespread backlash from the community, citing that some users had legitimate uses for modified clients, mainly to add quality of life (QoL) features that had not yet been added to the software, including additional accessibility features (such as allowing the display of subtitles on video players in worlds). The software was subsequently review bombed on Steam, while some community members urged others to cancel their VRC+ subscriptions. A spokesperson stated to Motherboard that its introduction of features such as OSC support had "enabled our users to have an entirely new dimension of creativity, as well as the ability to build accessibility tools to fit their needs".

In response to the criticism, VRChat announced that it had amended its development roadmap in order to prioritize the addition of a number of new accessibility and QoL features that had been highly requested by the community, with some being already implemented by VRChat themselves, and many others being revived by the community by using the new tools provided.

=== Ugandan Knuckles phenomenon ===
VRChat gave rise to a meme known as "Ugandan Knuckles", in which players use crude in-game models of Knuckles the Echidna from the Sonic the Hedgehog series while repeating the catchphrase "Do you know the way?" in a mock African accent. The players' model and mannerisms originated in a review by YouTuber Gregzilla and Forsen's Twitch stream respectively, in addition to lines from the Ugandan movie Who Killed Captain Alex? This has generated controversy from many sources; Polygon's Julia Alexander labelled it "blatantly racist" and a "problematic meme", comparing it to Habbo Hotel raids, and Jay Hathaway of The Daily Dot called it a "racist caricature". The creator of the 3D model used in the meme expressed regret for having made it, and urged players that they "do not use this to bug the users of VRChat." In response, the developers of the game published an open letter on Medium, stating that they were developing "new systems to allow the community to better self moderate" and asking users to use the built-in muting features.

== See also ==
- AltspaceVR – A platform providing meeting spaces in virtual reality
- Sansar – A social virtual reality platform with a near-identical premise
- Metaverse – Term for a collective three-dimensional virtual shared space
- NeosVR – A massively multiplayer online virtual reality game
- Resonite - A social VR game with in-game building features.
- Ready Player One - A novel revolving around a similar VR game.
- VTuber – Streamers that use virtual avatars
