= Vket =

Japanese virtual exhibition

Virtual Market バーチャル マーケット
- Nickname: Vket
- Status: Active
- Genre: Virtual market event
- Frequency: Twice yearly
- Venue: VRChat
- Country: Global
- Inaugurated: 26 August 2018; 8 years ago
- Founder: Phio
- Previous event: Virtual Market 2026 Summer (11–26 July 2026)
- Organiser: Hikky
- Website: Vket

Vket, also known in full as Virtual Market, is a virtual market event that has been hosted on the social platform VRChat since its inception in 2018. The event was created by VRChat player "Phio", and is organised by the Japanese virtual events business, Hikky. To date, fifteen events have been held at a frequency of two per year. Brands including Hewlett & Packard, 7 Eleven and Disney have hosted booths and exhibited products. Attendance has increased in line with the events popularity surge, with many totalling in the hundreds of thousands. Multiple other versions of the event, also organised by Hikky, include ComicVket, MusicVket and VketReal.

Multiple Vkets have broken records, including the Guinness World Record for "most booths at a virtual reality market event" at Vket 4 and "most avatar photos posted on Twitter in one hour" at Vket 6. Subsequent Vket events also broke records.

== Format ==
Virtual Market is set up as a virtual exhibition, hosted on the social platform VRChat. Exhibitors sign up for free and are then able to host an exhibit. Earlier Vkets had limited spaces for exhibitors, however this number has increased as the event has become more popular. Visitors to Vket events are able to make purchases through either the Japanese website Booth.pm, or through the e-commerce platform of the venue host. These are accessible through external links that can be interacted with at the virtual event. Product samples and QR codes are also made available to visitors.

== History ==

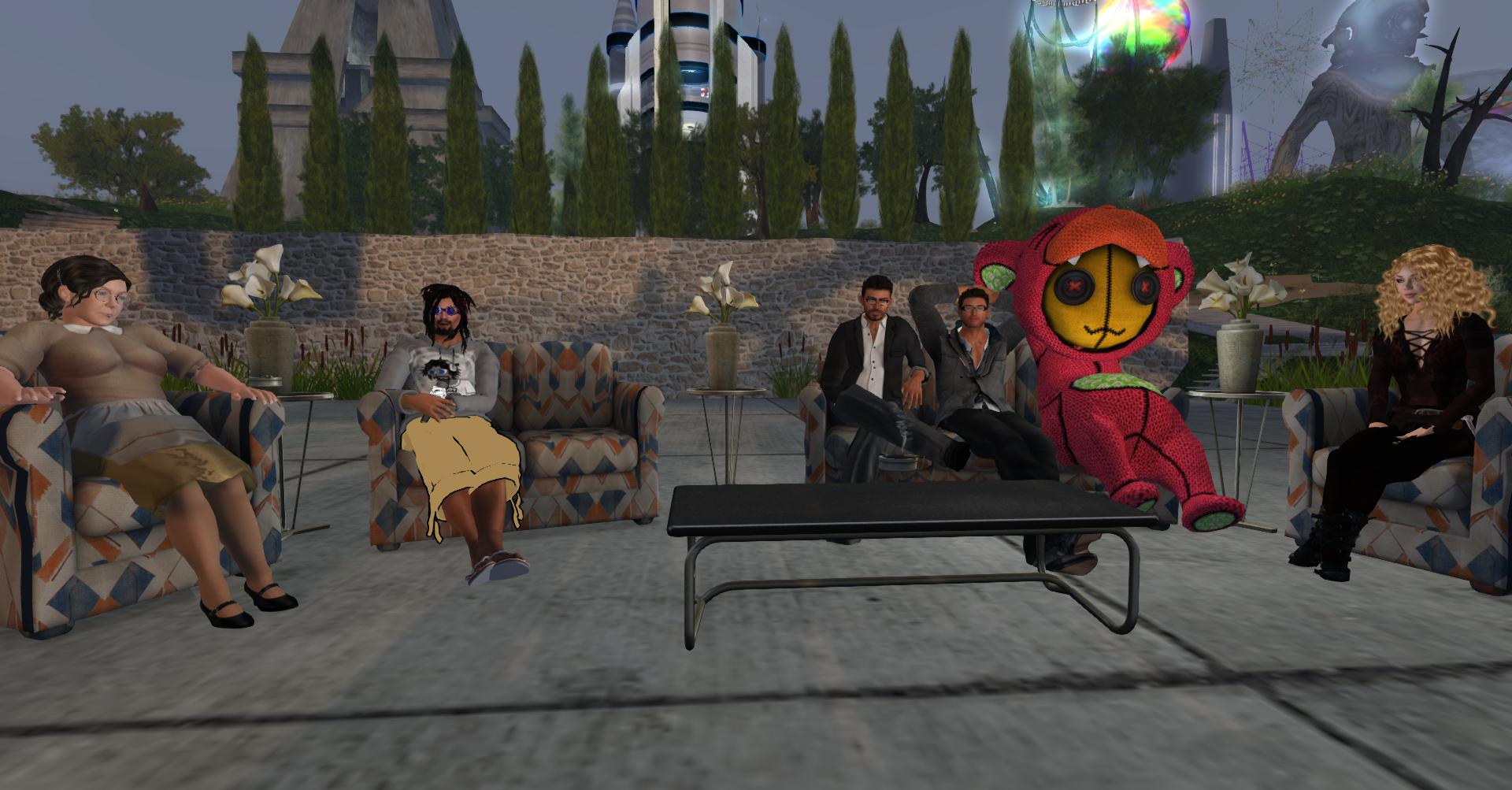
VRChat is the platform Vket is hosted on.

Virtual Market began as a project of VRChat player, "Phio the Alchemist". After hearing content creator Nekomasu talk about creating a country in VR space, Phio aimed to create fictionalised versions of real world cities, such as Tokyo, Japan, within the virtual space, in an effort to increase the amount of people who live there. To realise this, Phio learned how to model using the game engine, Unity. Spotting a growing trend for selling avatar models, Phio conceptualised an idea for a virtual event where individuals can showcase their work, for others to both enjoy and potentially purchase, having spent a period of time in VRChat and witnessing other creators publishing their work for free, Phio wanted to help expand the movement. For each Virtual Market, (Note: Also referred to as "Vket".) the concept of the Vket events were based on Comiket and Anime Expo, whilst the selling of products and assets through Japanese site Booth.pm, were comparable in function to Etsy.

Hikky, the organiser of Vket, was founded in 2018 by businessman Yasushi Funakoshi and artist Mika Sawae, among others. Funakoshi was initially sceptical about running a virtual events business, so drew on his prior experience as a student and business owner, and found himself able to form a partnership with Phio, who became Chief Virtual Officer. The first Vket was held during August 2018 for a period of one day, featuring 76 exhibitors in a VRChat world lacking a particular theme. Exhibitors displayed their content and assets in virtual "venues", with purchases being made through Booth.pm. The event became the top trending topic on Twitter, drawing publicity to Vket. Companies including Nijisanji, Seven & I Holdings and Gugenka joined as exhibitors for the second Vket. Performance issues experienced at the first Vket meant that the second Vket event required certain restrictions, these being a limit of 10MB for booths with a limit of 4x3x2m and a polygon limit of 70,000 for user avatars, with other limits also applied to renderers and colliders.

== Vket Cloud ==
In November 2021, Hikky raised ¥6,500,000,000 (US$57,000,000) in capital funding, from a procurement close with NTT Docomo. Hikky directed the funds into the organisation in an effort to expand their VR services domestically and in foreign regions, including the building of an "open metaverse". Hikky raised a further ¥500,000,000 (US$3,140,000) from shares with business partner Mediadoo Inc. in January 2022. Hikky realised their goal of creating a virtual metaverse on the fifth anniversary of Vket, through Vket Cloud, which was made available as a general service, after initially only being available to other companies, on 20 April 2023. A year later, Hikky announced the release of a dedicated browser world called "Vket Cloud: Entrance", run on the Vket Cloud engine. The world was made accessible to both PC and smartphone users, allowing up to fifty total connections at one time, with private registration only events also supported. The intention was to allow anybody to host and access their own events.

== ComicVket ==
Set up as a doujinshi sales event, ComicVket was first hosted by Hikky from 10-12 April 2020 on VRChat, cluster.mu and STYLY, as "ComicVket 0". The event focused specifically on manga, and allowed visitors to make purchases in the same manner as Vket. Whilst VRChat requires the use of a VR headset, cluster.mu and STYLY did not, differentiating itself from other virtual events. The second ComicVket, "ComicVket1", was held from 13-16 August 2020, was attended by over 100,000 and had 337 doujinshi circles exhibit. Due to being hosted during the COVID pandemic, the event offered a way for companies to keep in touch with their customers.

ComicVket 2, the third event, was held simultaneously with MusicVket 3 from 6-14 November 2021. Products were able to purchased both digitally and by mail. 180,000 visitors attended ComicVket 2 in total. The fourth event, ComicVket 3, was held from 23 February to 5 March 2023 and was centered around books. "Doujinshi Tower" was opened as a way for visitors "to discover a variety of books".

=== Previous events ===
Event	Date	Exhibitors	Ref.
ComicVket 0	10-12 April 2020	80 circles	
ComicVket 1	13-16 August 2020	337 circles and 60 companies	
ComicVket 2	6-14 November 2021	296 circles and 27 companies	
ComicVket 3	23 February-5 March 2023	300+ circles	

== MusicVket ==
First introduced alongside ComicVket 1 in 2020, and held at the same time, MusicVket is a music marketplace version of Virtual Market. It featured fewer circles, and could also be accessed through VRChat, cluster.mu and STYLY. MusicVket 2 was held from 6-10 March 2021, and featured nine spaces for exhibiting, with twenty-five artists. Tracks were able to be selected, followed by automatic opening in a browser. Artist booths were sorted by genre, for example "techno and club" and "classical ambient, folk jazz and fusion". Many works were fictional, with some artists selling items that were not just limited to music. Alexandra Hall, writing for Kotaku, described the event as a "venue to demo music I wouldn’t normally have been exposed to. Not to mention the ability to compensate the artists directly."

MusicVket 3 was held simultaneously alongside ComicVket 2. Distribution for MusicVket included both Bandcamp and Booth.pm, including the ability to show the preview of a music video for the work when an attendee approaches a booth. The fourth installment, MusicVket 4, was held from 18-26 June 2022. Leetspeak virtual monsters were featured, hosting a virtual live event with rock music on Vket Cloud, organised collaboratively by GLK Music and Vampire Inc.

Liberatune, a virtual tool used for performing music virtually live, was used at MusicVket 5. The tool functions in three instances, ambience, floor and stage. Using Liberatune, artists at MusicVket's OpenLive were able to experience a streamlined process, being able to perform using their virtual instruments, without the added difficulty of interim application processes. The most recent MusicVket, MusicVket 6, was held concurrently with Virtual Market 2024 Winter.

=== Previous events ===
Event	Date	Exhibitors	Ref.
MusicVket 1	13-16 August 2020	30 circles	
MusicVket 2	6-10 March 2021	218 circles (25 artists)	
MusicVket 3	6-14 November 2021	269 circles and 16 companies	
MusicVket 4	18-26 June 2022	300+ creators	
MusicVket 5	26 August-3 September 2023	375 circles	
MusicVket 6	7-22 December 2024	300 booths	

== My Vket ==
A service called "My Vket" was released in beta during late 2022, featuring a virtual avatar creator and virtual rooms, for use on smartphones and web browsers. Vket Avatar, the avatar creator, allowed the selection of presets including clothing and accessories to create customised virtual avatars for download. The creator enabled over five hundred million unique combinations. Vket ROOM, a virtual room creator, facilitated the setting up of a room using as many as ninety types of furniture presets, with the room having the option of being made public for sharing purposes. Multiplayer with the option of voice chat were supported.

== VketReal ==
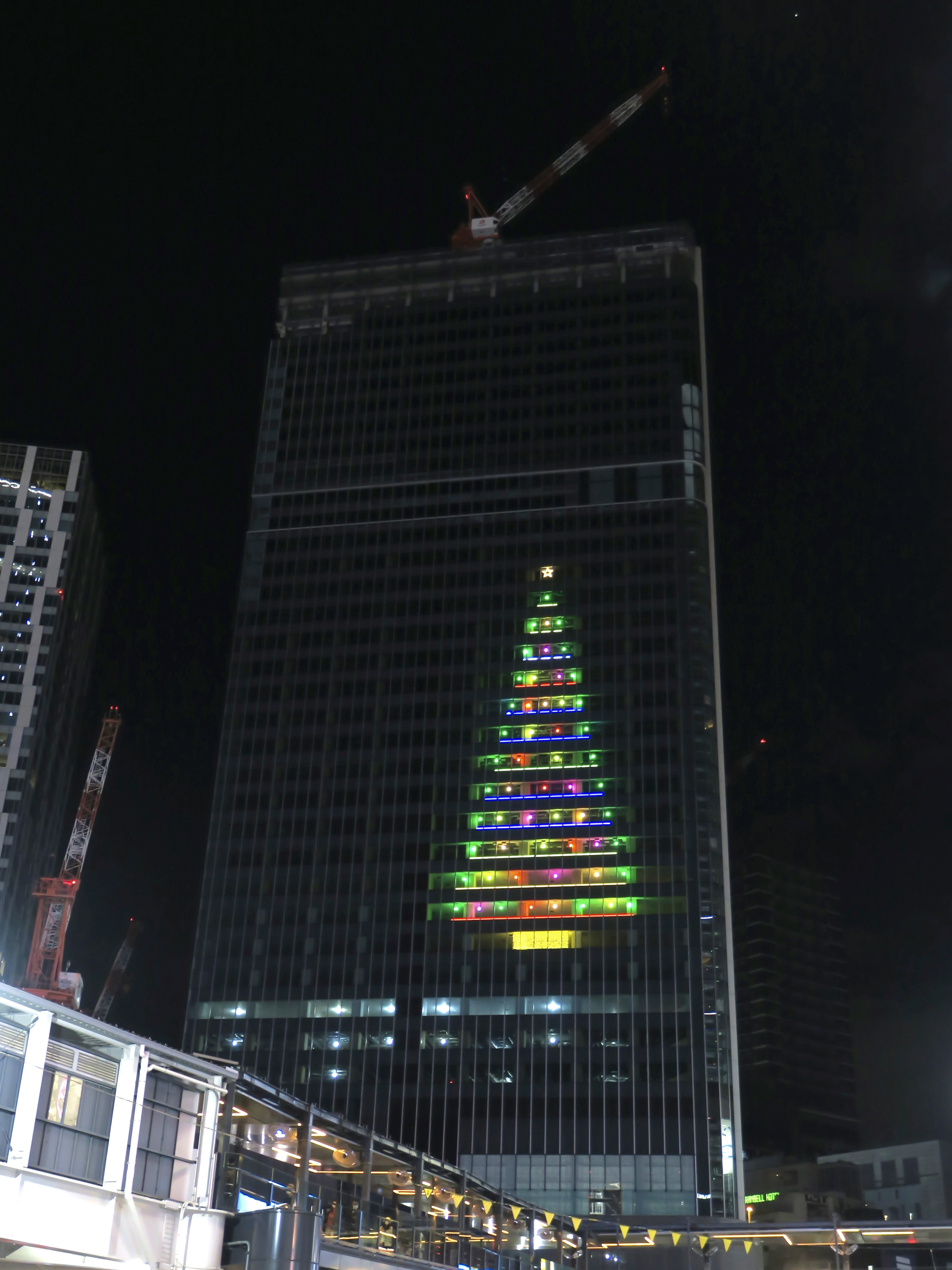
The second VketReal was held at Shibuya Sakura Stage in Shibuya, in addition to three other venues.

Serving as the real-world event for Virtual Market, VketReal was first held in Bellesalle Akihabara, Akihabara from 29-30 July 2023. The event featured a horse model provided by the Japan Racing Association. It was reported that the event had a high turnout. Michael Wilson of the University of Nevada, Reno hosted two booths at the first event, focusing on the Virtual Museum of Native American Basketry and 3D photogrammetry respectively. Participants at the photogrammetry booths were able to scan pre-selected items using an iPad, with the scanned items then viewable virtually after the event. Basket weaving was also taught by Wilson using Toki Pona. After holding a second event in Harajuku and Shibuya from 16-17 December 2023, VketReal was expanded to three locations at the third installment, hosted from 3-4 August 2024 at Bellesalle and TKP Garden City PREMIUM in Akihabara, Shibuya Sakura Stage in Shibuya and Namba Midosuji Hall in Osaka. The event organisers decided to scale down for the fourth VketReal, which was held from 21-22 December 2024, at Sunshine City in Ikebukuro. Wanting a higher quality event, the organisers cited a disadvantage of visitors not being able to see all the venues across multiple locations.

In an interview with CGWorld, the creators noticed a decline in the quality of booths being submitted, attributing this to free exhibition at the event for creators. To alleviate this issue, a fee and lottery system were set up to encourage higher quality work and reduce the number of participants overall, in turn making the event smaller in scale. A fifth event was held at Bellesalle from 26-27 July 2025. Temperatures were reportedly high, with visitors wearing wet towels to prevent heatstroke. The venue received a high turnout, despite being held on the same weekend as the Sumidagawa Fireworks Festival, which caused congestion on the local public railways. Future events were rumored to expand to other regions.

=== Previous events ===
Event	Date	Location(s)	Ref.
Virtual Market 2023 Real in Akiba	29-30 July 2023	Bellesalle Akihabara, Akihabara	
Virtual Market 2023 Real in Shibuhara	16-17 December 2023	Harajuku and Shibuya	
VketReal 2024 Summer	3-4 August 2024	Akihabara, Shibuya and Osaka	
VketReal 2024 Winter	21-22 December 2024	Ikebukuro	
VketReal 2025 Summer	26-27 July 2025	Bellesalle Akihabara, Akihabara	
VketReal 2025 Winter	20-21 December 2025	Akihabara	
VketReal 2026 Summer	25-26 July 2026	Bellesalle Akihabara, Akihabara	

=== Upcoming events ===
Event	Date	Location(s)	Refs.

== Vket events ==
=== Previous events ===
Event	Date	Location	Exhibitors	Information	Ref.
Virtual Market	26 August 2018	VRChat	76 circles	First Virtual Market to be held. Became Twitter's top trending topic on the day it was live.	
Second Virtual Market	8-10 March 2019	VRChat	426 circles 20 companies	"Log in to the future" was the event theme. 20 companies exhibited in total, with an attendance of 125,000. VRChat hosted six worlds, divided into an entrance world and five separate themes including "Mokuri Bazaar", "Splendid Expo", "Otherworld Marche", "Future Terminal" and "Virtual Museum".	
Third Virtual Market	21-28 September 2019	VRChat	600 circles 30 companies	"Another Reality" was the event theme. 30 companies exhibited in total. The event was attended by 710,000. Featured content from Criminal Girls X, Kotodaman, and DOAXVV. VRChat hosted fifteen venues across six world instances, including "Castello Magica", "Kowloon Empire Imperial Citadel", "Neo Shibuya", "Pretty Pop Party", "Sky Island", and "Virtual Factory". 7 Eleven and WEGO hosted virtual branches. The event was initially planned to run until 25 September, but was extended to 28 September due to connection issues experienced by visitors during the event.	
Fourth Virtual Market	29 April-10 May 2020	VRChat	1400 circles 43 companies	"VR Art" was the theme for this event. 43 companies exhibited, with over half a million in attendance. Physical merchandise from Nier Automata was available from a booth ran by Square Enix in collaboration with Seven & I Holdings, with individuals who made purchases receiving 3D weapon data as a bonus. Sega sold 3D models of Virtua Fighter characters Akira Yuki and Pai Chan, along with Space Channel 5 Part 2 character Ulala. The 1990 role-playing game Knight of Queen also exhibited at the event. The event was awarded a Guinness World Record for having the "most booths at a virtual reality market event", at 1,104.	
Fifth Virtual Market	18 December 2020-10 January 2021	VRChat	1500+ circles 70 companies	"World Beyond" was the event theme. 70 companies exhibited, with an attendance of over a million. This event marked the first time English was supported as a language, in addition to the usual Japanese. Vket 5 featured six concepts shown in forty-one worlds, with the three main worlds being "World Beyond DAY", "World Beyond EVENING", and "World Beyond NIGHT". Hewlett & Packard Japan held a 3D model exhibit for their "RX-78-02" Gundam, created using HP workstations. The company also showcased a 3D model of their new HP Reverb G2 virtual reality headset.	
Sixth Virtual Market	14-28 August 2021	VRChat	465 circles 60 companies	"Festivals of the World" was the theme of this event. 60 companies exhibited. A central world called "Core" was set up for Vket 6. Another venue for mobile devices was also hosted. Virtual recreations of Tokyo and London were featured throughout the event, with the latter location including London buses. Apparel from Pui Pui Molcar and Amaim Warrior at the Borderline also exhibited in this area. Students from Digital Hollywood University exhibited a virtual campus, hosted as a festival and including activities such as shooting. This was the second Vket event to be awarded a Guinness World Record, this being for "most avatar photos posted on Twitter in one hour", at 2,311.	
Virtual Market 2021	4-19 December 2021	VRChat	600 circles 80 companies	The event theme was "Metaverse City". 80 companies exhibited. Akihabara was created as a world for the event, with the East Japan Railway Company co-operating as a "special" sponsor. Japanese department store Daimaru, owned by Japanese holding company J. Front Retailing, hosted a "next generation" store at the event. Both virtual 3D goods and real wares, such as clothes and food were made available to purchase. A "metaverse banquet", attended by over one hundred people, was held during the event.	
Virtual Market 2022 Summer	13-28 August 2022	VRChat	540 circles 70 companies	The theme of this event was "The Origin". 70 companies exhibited, and over one million people attended the event. New York City was designed as a primary location for this event. The size requirements of the world meant loading times were longer. Numerous activities were available for visitors, such as a balloon ride to the top of a virtual water slide and a build-your-own forest camp simulator. Established Japanese companies Mizuho Bank and Rohto Pharmaceutical hosted venues at the event, with the latter providing services for online food ordering. Optimisation remained an issue due to a recent VRChat update introducing EasyAntiCheat to the platform.	
Virtual Market 2022 Winter	3-18 December 2022	VRChat	540 circles 70 companies	The event theme was "Next Journey". 70 companies exhibited, with over a million in attendance. Paris and Nagoya were created virtually for the event. Tokyo Idol Festival music group Enogu also hosted their own world. Disney+ series Hannibal had a first-person view interactive setup that presented the story in a virtual format. The Japanese electronics company Alpine hosted an exhibit at the event, with visitors able to drive a rental car with camping gear.	
Virtual Market 2023 Summer	15-30 July 2023	VRChat	700 circles 73 companies	The theme for this event was "Connect". 73 companies exhibited. Japanese food company Nissin Foods were at the virtual event, exhibiting their "Cup Noodle" offering to visitors. Hikky collaborated with HUB Akihabara who held a real event at their store from 29-30 July 2023. A virtual market character, drawn by Pop Team Epic creator Bkub Okawa, was distributed as part of the in person event. This was the third event to be awarded a Guinness World Record, this time for "most videos of avatars performing choreographed dances posted on Twitter in one hour", at 665.	
Virtual Market 2023 Winter	2-17 December 2023	VRChat	900	The theme for this event was also "Connect". A record 85 companies exhibited, with over 1.2 million visitors in attendance. Areas were created for Shibuya and Harajaku, with kawaii aesthetic theming. Rohto Pharmaceutical exhibited again, along with other companies such as Tokyo Metro who hosted a virtual recreation of the Tokyo Metro 1000 series, which is used on the line in real life. J. Front Retailing also returned, collaborating with Daimaru Matsuzakaya to release five exclusive avatars. A virtual area was also created for London, which featured a subway and magic theming.	
Virtual Market 2024 Summer	20 July-4 August 2024	VRChat	1000	The theme for this event was "Boundless!" 85 companies exhibited, with 1.3 million visitors in attendance. On X, Vket related posts reached over 60,000, setting a new record and contributing to higher activity on social media throughout the event. Japanese rock band FZMZ performed in a virtual live show at the event on July 20 and 28, with attendance in the world reaching 770. This was the fourth and most recent Vket event to be awarded a Guinness World Record. The record was for the "most photos of avatars toasting uploaded to X in one hour" at 1,202.	
Virtual Market 2024 Winter	7-22 December 2024	VRChat	1293 (spaces)	The theme for this event was also "Boundless!". 21 venues exhibited, and 1.2 million visitors attended in total. A virtual velodrome called "Shizuoka Velodrome" exhibited at this event, allowing visitors to bet on keirin races based on real life counterparts. Canon Inc. exhibited a lense at the event that attached to cameras, rendering the scenery into VR. Robot Consulting Co., Ltd. hosted a virtual courthouse at the event, and a "Robot Lawyer", using AI, that answered legal questions relating to digital space law.	
Virtual Market 2025 Summer	12-27 July 2025	VRChat	712 (spaces)	The theme for this event was "Key of Discovery". 1.35 million visitors attended the event, breaking previous records and more than five hundred community-led events were hosted during the two week period.	
Virtual Market 2025 Winter	6-21 December 2025	VRChat			
Virtual Market 2026 Summer	11-26 July 2026	VRChat	857 (spaces)	Announced on 6 March 2026, the theme was revealed as "Passion". Nineteen worlds are planned for exhibitors, split between seven worlds for PC users with sixteen concepts and one cross-platform world with three concepts.	

== Critical analysis ==
In a chapter for the book "Gaming the Metaverse", author Nicolle Lamerichs described the VRChat worlds Vket uses during its events as more "detailed, aesthetically pleasing and lively compared to the "dead malls" that many Western tools have to offer." Lamerichs juxtaposed "virtual identity" with the real desires of the people beyond the game, and concluded that without choice, human expressions such as fashion become "meaningless".

A conference paper written by Mhaidli et al for the 2025 Conference on Human Factors in Computing Systems investigated the effect of advertisements on users of VRChat. Vket was found to be a fun event with minimal advertisements, with participants in the investigation finding the adverts that were present causing either "slight annoyance" or found to be "fun experiences". Some participants went onto make purchases from the adverts, meaning the adverts were not enjoyed for their function, but were instead "fun" as part of the "VR experience". The 2023 AFHE Conference examined the relationship between kawaii avatar motions and consumer behaviour, specifically purchase intention, within the metaverse, with Vket described as being a "new area of business". The study analyzed the data of thirty-five graduate students, using Google Forms to survey a specifically designed female avatar to determine a positive correlation between buyer intention dependent on kawaii motion. The study was ultimately approved by the Life Science Committee of Japan Advanced Institute of Science and Technology.

University of Zagreb undergraduate David Minđek identified major factors preventing VRChat from becoming a "true metaverse" in 2023. These including the lack of an "internal economy", despite users having the ability to create avatars, worlds and events including Virtual Market. Nintendo of America software engineer Hideki Saito identified patterns with the "ecosystem", positing that Japanese players are much more likely to create their own avatar compared to players from other countries. The gap between starting to play VRChat, ranking up to the trust rank level that allows for user uploads means players are exposed to "avatar worlds", in turn encouraging them to create their own "identity" once the game allows them to. Saito explains that Japanese culture plays a key role in assets being sold, shared and used to build player identity within the virtual ecosystem. In 2025, VRChat introduced an "Avatar Marketplace" that allows creators signed up to their "Creator Economy" program to sell avatars using the service. Players use a digital credits currency to make purchases, with creators receiving the majority revenue cut. Previously, the primary way to buy assets and avatars was through Vket.
