= Open Asset Import Library =

- Developer(s): Alexander Gessler; Thomas Schulze; Kim Kulling, et al.
- Stable release: 6.0.2 / 8 June 2025; 2 months ago
- Repository: github.com/assimp/assimp
- Operating system: Cross-platform
- Type: 3D model import library
- License: BSD
- Website: www.assimp.org

Open Asset Import Library (Assimp) is a cross-platform 3D model import library which aims to provide a common application programming interface (API) for different 3D asset file formats. Written in C++, it offers interfaces for both C and C++. Bindings to other languages (e.g., BlitzMax, C#, Python) are developed as part of the project or are available elsewhere. Given the importance and benefits of Assimp, a pure Java (/Kotlin) port is being developed here.

The imported data is provided in a straightforward, hierarchical data structure. Configurable post processing steps (i.e., normal and tangent generation, various optimizations) augment the feature set.

Assimp currently supports 57 different file formats for reading, including COLLADA (.dae), 3DS, DirectX X, Wavefront OBJ and Blender 3D (.blend). As of Version 3.0 Assimp also provides export functionality for some file formats.

== Projects using Assimp ==
Several open source projects use Assimp, such as MonoGame and Urho3D.

Resonite (and its predecessor NeosVR) – A social virtual reality platform that uses Assimp to import a wide range of 3D model formats, facilitating its real-time and collaborative content creation features.

Torque3D added Assimp in Torque3D 4.0.

Godot added Assimp in Godot 3.2, but this was replaced in Godot 3.3 and later.

== See also ==
- OpenCTM
- MeshLab
