= Persistent Chat =

Persistent Chat is a messaging concept for group chat software that consists of standing, topic-based chatrooms with an emphasis on real-time messaging, that preserves conversation history over time which is visible to both current and future participants. This form of messaging was adopted by many organizations in regulated industries, to ensure compliance and was popular with the major financial centers around the world.

== History ==
The Persistent Chat feature was first introduced in Microsoft Lync 2013 as a group chat offering that allows teams to create topic-focused discussions. However, in the past it has been labeled as Group Chat, MindAlign Group Chat by Parlano was created in 2000 and was later acquired by Microsoft in 2007. MindAlign provides an IRC like chatroom experience where topical chatrooms can be looked back through. Since then the Group Chat feature has surfaced in Microsoft's Office Communications Server 2007 R2 which later became Lync 2010 before the term Persistent Chat was finally introduced in Microsoft Lync 2013 (now known as Skype for Business).

== Use cases ==
According to Microsoft, persistent chat rooms should be considered for the following use cases: “Coordinate events, create ask-the-expert and Q&A forums, Brainstorm, create a bulletin-board environment for evolving topics, collect feedback from colleagues and test new features, and share information among employees across different working hours and locations.” Before the introduction of the Persistent Chat feature in Microsoft's Unified Communications products, it was used by the financial services sector to “keep client banks up-to-the-minute on changes” in the foreign exchange market.

== Persistent Chat today ==
Most chat applications' conversation history persists today and is usually not referred to as ‘Persistent Chat’ but rather as ‘Chat History’ from consumer applications, like WhatsApp, to enterprise applications, like Slack or Microsoft Teams, each of these applications features chat history. As such persisting chat history has become somewhat of a norm in messaging applications.

== Chat that persists versus Persistent Chat ==
Although the use of the term ‘Persistent Chat’ is not commonly used in most applications, Persistent Chat differs from applications that support conversation or chat history regarding the original use case the technology was built for. Along with conversation history that persists over time, historically MindAlign (Persistent Chat) was and is still used as an always-on communication channel "for conducting ongoing business-critical conversations" that are often transactional, specifically in the financial services sector.
