= Delivrance =

Delivrance may refer to:

- Délivrance, a studio album by A Hawk and a Hacksaw released in 2009
- La Délivrance, a 16-foot statue in bronze in Barnet, France

== See also ==
- Deliverance (disambiguation)
