= ALVAO =

Czech software company

ALVAO s.r.o.
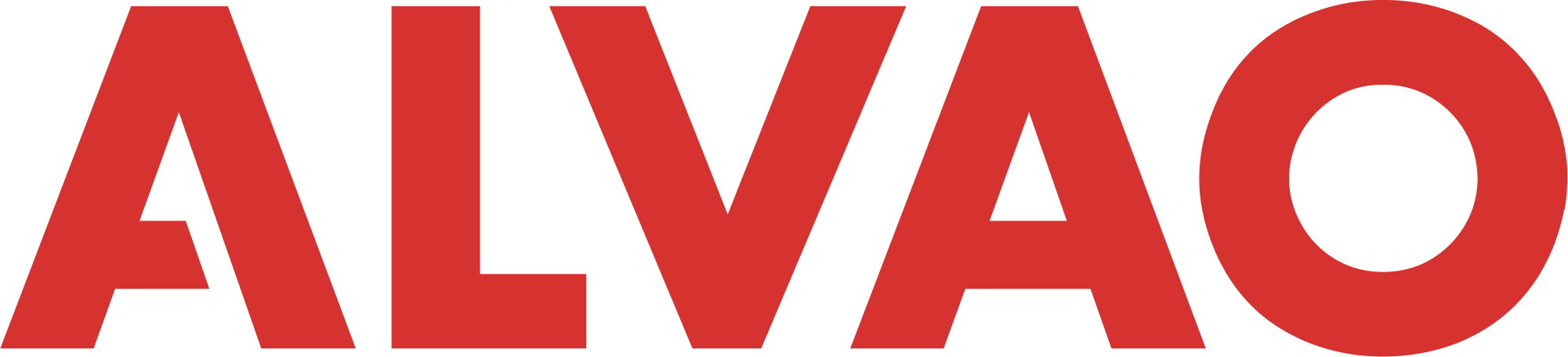
- Current company logo
- Industry: Information technology
- Founded: 12 April 1999
- Founder: Radek Grodl (CEO), Roman Jezdik (CTO)
- Headquarters: Žďár nad Sázavou, Czech republic
- Number of locations: 3
- Area served: Worldwide
- Products: Service management, Asset management
- Revenue: CZK 96 million (2024).
- Number of employees: 60 (2025)
- Website: https://www.alvao.com/en/

ALVAO s.r.o. is a Czech software company founded in 1999 and focused on developing IT Service Management (ITSM) and IT Asset Management (ITAM) tools on the Microsoft platform.

== History ==
The company was founded in 1999 by classmates Radek Grodl, and Roman Ježdík

Originally operating under the name ALC, the company developed software for public administration. One of its first products was Evidence počítačů (“Computer Records”), which later evolved into today’s ALVAO Asset Management.

The company gained wider recognition after participating in the Invex trade fair, where it obtained its first commercial customers. In 2009, it was a finalist in the Microsoft Technology Awards, and in 2021 it won the Microsoft Awards 2021 in the Community Response Award category for its asset overview and internal services digitization solution for emergency services.

With support from EU funding, it has invested in technology development, AI implementation, and expansion into the USA and the UK.

== Products ==
ALVAO Service Desk: Software for managing requests, incidents, and services within organizations. It supports process automation and integration with Microsoft 365, Copilot, or Microsoft Teams.

ALVAO Asset Management: A system for managing the lifecycle of IT and non-IT assets, including inventories, records, and configuration (CMDB). It supports integration with internal processes and automation of routine tasks. Since March of 2026, a free plan of IT asset management is available on the ALVAO website and Microsoft AppSource.

The company holds ISO/IEC 27001 and SOC 2 Type 2 and pinkVERIFY (7 processes) certifications. ALVAO products are available as SaaS on the Microsoft Azure platform or as on-premise installations. ALVAO solutions are also part of the Czech Republic’s E-Government Cloud, Slovakia’s cloud and since 2022 the G-Cloud in the UK.
