= Bedny =

Bedny, also transliterated Bednyy, Bednyi and Bednyj, is a surname. Notable people with the surname include:

- Demyan Bedny (1883–1945), Soviet poet
- Gregory Bedny (1938–2018), Ukrainian-American psychologist
