= NeosVR =

Virtual reality application

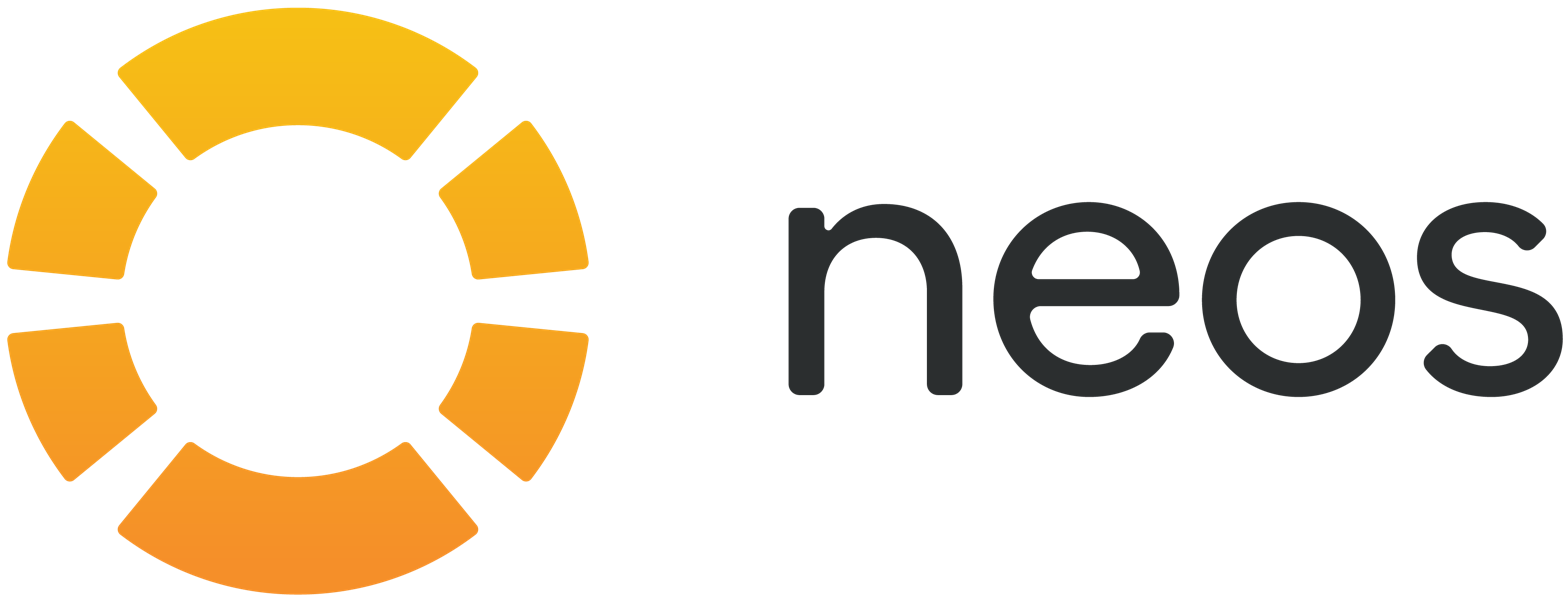
- Developer: Solirax
- Publisher: Solirax
- Designer: Frooxius
- Programmer: Frooxius
- Engine: Hybrid, FrooxEngine (custom), and Unity
- Platforms: Microsoft Windows, Linux
- Release: May 4, 2018
- Genre: Massively multiplayer online
- Mode: Multiplayer

NeosVR was a free-to-play, massively multiplayer online, virtual reality application created by Frooxius and operated by Solirax. It was released for free on Microsoft Windows via Steam on May 4, 2018, with support for several VR headsets.

The game allowed users to interact with one another as avatars and featured development tools for players to create in-game elements such as games and maps. It was also usable without VR in a “desktop” mode through the use of a mouse and keyboard or gamepad.

As of August 20th, 2025, online cloud services for NeosVR have been shutdown, and the game has been since delisted on Steam. Local play, LAN play, and VLAN play remain as the only options to continue playing.

== Gameplay ==
The gameplay of NeosVR bears similarities to that of VRChat and AltspaceVR. Players interact with each other through virtual 2D and 3D avatars capable of lip sync, eye tracking, blinking, and a complete range of motion. The game may be played with either VR equipment or in a desktop configuration. Some limitations, such as the inability to freely move an avatar’s limbs or perform interactions that require one hand, exist in desktop mode.

NeosVR's selection of worlds includes minigames, social lounges, and worlds created by the user base. A single user may have several multiplayer worlds loaded at the same time. Users can customize their own worlds entirely from within NeosVR without the use of external SDKs, though it is possible to upload custom content such as code and in-game items for use.

== Events ==
Since 2020, NeosVR hosted an annual competition known as the “Metaverse Maker Competition”. Participants are given one month to bring their unique ideas to life using only resources created during the month.

Most Sundays, players could come together at an event hosted by Creator Jam known as creator jams. Each event had a specific topic in which players would build objects and experiences for.

Similar to the MMC, Neos Festa was a Japanese-hosted annual event in which players would construct a booth to present their creations.

== Hardware and software support ==
NeosVR supports many VR headsets such as Oculus Rift, Oculus Rift S, Oculus Quest and Oculus Quest 2 with Quest link, Oculus Go, Pimax headsets, HTC Vive, Valve Index, and the Windows Mixed Reality headsets. Controllers with finger presence detection, like the Valve Index, enable users to perform hand and finger movements that can be used to trigger specific facial expressions, animations, or customized events.

In addition to headsets, NeosVR supports a variety of VR accessories such as the Leap Motion finger-tracking module and the HTC Vive Facial Tracker, enabling a user to visibly broadcast lower facial expressions and speech. The HTC Vive Pro Eye is also supported, enabling the use of eye presence in select avatars.

NeosVR also offers support for hip and feet tracking, also known as 'full-body' tracking. Through inverse kinematics, the system calculates movement using up to eight extra trackers to replicate a person's physical movements in real-time.

NeosVR offers native Bhaptics haptic suit support used to immerse a player within the game using vibrations.

== Usage ==
Users may import and create avatars from 3D models using NeosVR's built-in "avatar creator". In addition to avatars, users can write computer programs using LogiX, a node-based programming system implemented within NeosVR. LogiX may be used to drive functionality for avatars, worlds and other inventions.

Users are able to create procedural textures and meshes in-game using the in-game component browser.

== Controversy and fork ==
In 2023, most of Neos's development team parted ways with the company due to disagreements with Solirax, notably regarding disputes over the promotion of cryptocurrency, leading to predominantly negative user reviews on Steam ever since. The departing developers subsequently formed a new project titled, Resonite, launching it as a spiritual successor in Early Access in October 2023.

== See also ==
- AltspaceVR – a Microsoft-based virtual reality social platform (terminated by Microsoft, as of March 10, 2023)
- Sansar – social virtual reality platform developed by the Second Life team
- Resonite – spiritual successor to NeosVR
