= Gregory Bedny =

Ukrainian-American psychologist (1938–2018)

Gregory Z. Bedny
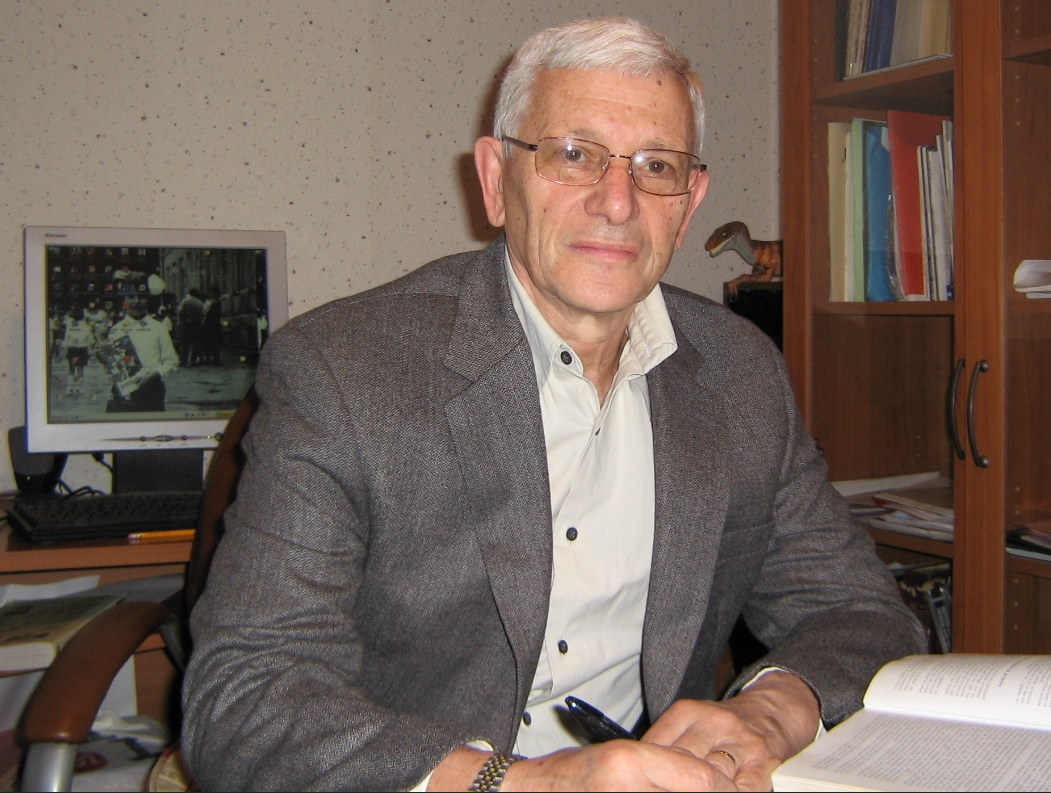
- Born: October 8, 1938; Odesa, Ukraine (the former Soviet Union)
- Died: July 22, 2018 (aged 79); Wayne, New Jersey, United States
- Known for: A founder of the Systemic-Structural Activity Theory (SSAT)
- Scientific career
- Fields: Human factors Ergonomics

Gregory Z. Bedny (Ukrainian: Бєдний Григорій Захарович; October 8, 1938 – July 22, 2018), a Ukrainian-American psychologist, was the founder of the Systemic-Structural Activity Theory (SSAT). He developed the qualitative and quantitative methods of the assessment of complexity, reliability and efficiency of human performance and applied his methods to human-machine and human-computer interaction.

== Biography ==
Gregory Bedny was raised in Odesa, Ukraine (the former Soviet Union). In the early years of his career he taught some technical subjects in the vocational training system and worked as an industrial engineer. This experience inspired some of his earliest research and publications. After defending his PhD in 1969, he worked as a professor of psychology at Odesa State Academy of Civil Engineering and Architecture. At this university he created the first in Ukraine ergonomic laboratory and took part in writing the first program for teaching ergonomics at colleges. He was the first one in Ukraine to write a textbook in ergonomics. In 1987 Gregory Bedny was awarded the post doctorate degree (Doctor of Science) at the National Academy of Pedagogical Science in Moscow. After moving to the US in 1989 he taught psychology at Essex County College and at New Jersey Institute of Technology.

== Academic work ==
He established and chaired the Systemic-Structural Activity Theory session at the International Conference on Applied Human Factors and Ergonomics. Over the course of his life Gregory published 18 scholarly monographs (8 of them in English) and numerous articles in such subjects as psychology, ergonomics and theory of activity.

== Selected publications ==
- Bedny, G. Z. and Bedny, I. S. (2018). Activity Studies Within the Framework of Ergonomics, Psychology, and Economics. CRC Press/Taylor & Francis Group.
- Bedny, G. Z. (2014). Application of Systemic-Structural Activity Theory to Design and Training. CRC Press/Taylor & Francis Group.
- Bedny, G. Z., Bedny, I. S., and W. Karwowski (2014). Applying Systemic-Structural Activity Theory to Design of Human-Computer Interaction Systems. CRC Press/Taylor & Francis Group.
- Bedny, G. Z. and W. Karwowski (2006). A Systemic-Structural Theory of Activity: Applications to Human Performance and Work Design. CRC Press/Taylor & Francis Group.
- Meister, D. and Bedny, G. Z. (1997). The Russian Theory of Activity: Current Applications to Design and Learning. Lawrence Erlbaum Associates, Inc.
