= Virtual Desktop =

Virtual reality software

- Original author: Guy Godin
- Release: March 2016
- Platform: Meta Horizon OS, HTC, and Pico system software (Android); Windows 10 and 11 (PC client)
- Website: www.vrdesktop.net

Virtual Desktop is remote control software for Android-based virtual reality headsets. It allows users to control a PC over a wireless LAN from the headset, including the ability to stream VR games and software.

The original version of Virtual Desktop (now branded as Virtual Desktop Classic) was designed as a 3D windowing environment for PCs using Oculus Rift and SteamVR. In May 2019, an Android port of Virtual Desktop was announced as a launch app for the Oculus Quest headsets; this app is designed to allow users to wirelessly control a PC from their headset. It has since been released for other Android-based headsets, including Pico, HTC Vive Focus 3, and HTC Vive XR Elite.

== Features ==
Virtual Desktop displays the PC's display as a window in three-dimensional space. By default, the screen is displayed within a virtual theatre setting, but other backdrops and environments can be used.

In May 2019, Virtual Desktop was released as a remote control software for the Oculus Quest, with the ability to wirelessly stream from a host computer headset. Godin later added an additional feature to stream VR games, Facebook forced the developer to remove the update citing that its "stream quality wasn’t reliable enough for Quest owners". An unofficial patch was released outside of the Quest store. However in February 2021, while submitting a version with the feature for inclusion on the less-restrictive Oculus App Lab store, the company backpedaled and approved the feature in the Quest store version of Virtual Desktop.

In March 2024, Virtual Desktop added emulated SteamVR body and finger tracking support on Meta Quest. Finger tracking support emulates the Valve Index controllers, and body tracking emulates HTC Vive Tracker devices. On Quest 2 and newer, this feature utilizes the "generative legs" API for estimated leg motion, as well as the inside-out body tracking API on Quest 3 for upper body tracking. Inverse kinematics are used on older Quest models. In August 2026, Virtual Desktop added beta support for wired USB tethering on Meta Quest, utilizing ethernet over USB. This can be used as an alternative to Wi-Fi in situations where network congestion or router placement can impact stream quality.

== Reception ==
In a review by Engadget upon the release of its PC version, Virtual Desktop was praised for its simplicity and functionality, with its reviewer noting that it was comfortable enough to use for general web browsing tasks, and for watching videos.

The Meta Quest version of Virtual Desktop was noted by critics as increasing the flexibility of the device by allowing users to play PC-compatible VR games wirelessly (as opposed to the headset's "Link" feature, which streams over a USB connection to the host computer). In a May 2020 reappraisal of the Oculus Quest, Sam Byford of The Verge noted that Virtual Desktop "[wasn't] noticeably worse" than Oculus Link, but that its quality depended on the amount of overall activity on the user's network.

== See also ==
- Steam Link
