= Microsoft Mesh =

Collaboration platform by Microsoft

- Developer: Microsoft
- Initial release: 7 September 2023; 2 years ago

Final release(s) [±]
- Windows: 5.2514.6.0 / 22 October 2025; 7 months ago
- Meta Horizon: 5.2514.6.0 / 22 October 2025; 7 months ago
- Operating system: Windows 10, 11; Meta Horizon OS
- Predecessor: AltspaceVR
- Successor: Microsoft Teams Immersive
- Type: Mixed reality
- Website: www.microsoft.com/en-us/microsoft-teams/microsoft-mesh

Microsoft Mesh was a cloud-based platform for collaboration in mixed reality, offering it both as an app and as a service. Microsoft Mesh leveraged Microsoft 365 to allow people in different physical locations, using different types of devices, to participate and collaborate in a shared immersive space. There were two different applications of Mesh: Immersive Spaces in Microsoft Teams and custom environments developed with Unity and used with a dedicated Mesh client application.

While Microsoft makes the Hololens 2 and has partnered with most major PC manufacturers like HP to build Windows Mixed Reality VR headsets, Microsoft Mesh was designed to be device and operating system agnostic. However, it only supported Windows and Meta VR headsets.

It made use of elements of the AltspaceVR platform Microsoft acquired in 2017. Mesh was first announced at Microsoft's Ignite conference in 2021.

Microsoft Mesh officially transitioned out of its preview phase and was released in January 2024, becoming a listed component of Microsoft Teams, although also having its standalone app. Ahead of Ignite 2024, Christian Cawley wrote for TechRadar that "some might argue [that the promise of Mesh] has yet to be fully delivered.

Microsoft has worked with companies such as Accenture and Takeda to test Mesh.

Mesh as a stand-alone platform was shut down in December 2025, with its functionality now built directly into Microsoft Teams. The Register described the shutdown as "the end of an era" for Microsoft, as the company moved away from immersive environments and instead focused further on artificial intelligence.
