= We Met in Virtual Reality =

2022 documentary

- Sundance Film Festival poster
- Directed by: Joe Hunting
- Written by: Joe Hunting
- Produced by: Joe Hunting; Charlotte Cook
- Starring: Jenny0629; Ray_is_Deaf; DustBunny; Toaster; DragonHeart; IsYourBoi
- Production companies: Painted Clouds; Field of Vision; Cinetic Media; XTR
- Distributed by: HBO Documentary Films
- Release dates: January 21, 2022 (Sundance); July 27, 2022 (HBO Max)
- Running time: 91 minutes
- Country: United Kingdom
- Languages: English; American Sign Language

We Met in Virtual Reality is a 2022 documentary film that takes place entirely within the social virtual reality platform VRChat. It explores the social relations developed by the users of VRChat during the COVID-19 pandemic, and how their lives were changed by their time on the platform. It was created by Joe Hunting, who was the director and writer of the script.

We Met premiered at the 2022 Sundance Film Festival on 21 January 2022, and was added to HBO Max on 27 July. It has received critical acclaim from film critics, especially regarding emotional scenes. Reviews from technology and gaming outlets were mixed, largely because virtual reality itself is not explained, and because of continuous VRChat graphical glitches.

== Synopsis ==
The film follows multiple figures throughout the runtime of the movie, in chronological order for over a year, often switching back and forth to explore their lives on the platform as their relationships evolve. The featured subjects are two dancer couples who fell in love in VR, as well as two sign language instructors coping with major life events. The film investigates why they use the platform and how it has helped them during the COVID-19 pandemic. How the platform and technology work is not addressed.

DustBunny, a virtual reality belly dance instructor, first met her boyfriend Toaster in VRChat; they started their relationship without ever having met in real life. Himself a dancer, Toaster explains that he never used his microphone in VRChat until he met DustBunny. The pair persists even though they live in different countries; they describe and reenact their first in-person meeting at an airport multistorey. They express their desire to eventually live together in the real world. To mentally prepare for their next in-person visit, they fly together on a virtual passenger jet.

Jenny and Ray are teachers at the VR sign language academy Helping Hands. Jenny, who has auditory processing disorder, recounts having attempted suicide and turning to VR afterward. She recalls learning how to adapt her signs for VR from Ray, who is completely deaf. At one lecture, she announces that she will be substituting for Ray for the first time; Ray is actively grieving the loss of his brother, who died by suicide. He explains how his friends at the virtual academy worked to comfort him and his family. In the night, Ray releases a sky lantern with a goodbye message for his brother.

Leah is an exotic dancer performing at a virtual dance club. Upon taking the stage, she announces that her dance will be a gift for her boyfriend DragonHeart, who is in the front row. The two met in virtual reality, and have had difficulty meeting in person due to COVID-19 lockdowns in their respective countries. At her surprise birthday party, Leah tearfully accepts DragonHeart's marriage proposal. They arrange for 3D modelers to create wedding attire for their avatars. The wedding is held in a fantasy cathedral with friends and family in the pews. After their vows, a thread appears and connects their rings. The couple pledges to one day marry again in person.

== Release ==
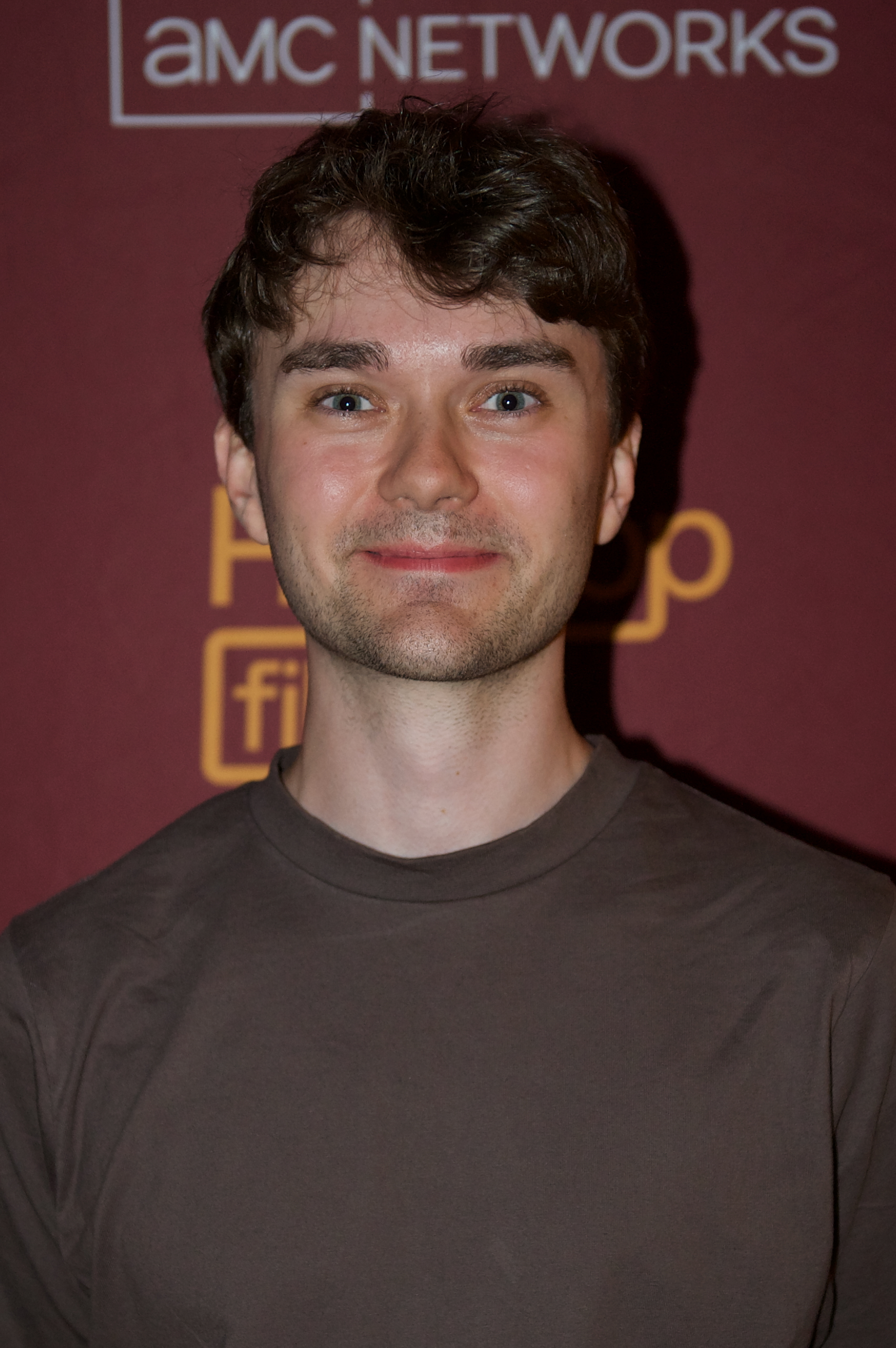
Director Joe Hunting

We Met in Virtual Reality had its world premiere at the 2022 Sundance Film Festival on 21 January 2022. It was released for air on HBO and streaming on HBO Max on 27 July. A screening for the cast and backers was held in VRChat on 19 August.

== Reception ==
We Met in Virtual Reality gained a 94% critic rating from Rotten Tomatoes, with a 34 of the 36 reviews being favorable. Consensus reads, "We Met in Virtual Reality takes a visually striking approach to its investigation of human interactions on the VR plane, with surprisingly poignant results."

According to The Hollywood Reporter, "watching We Met in Virtual Reality, you very quickly notice that the two people cuddling have horns and a tail and that the airplane they seem to be sitting on doesn’t exist. The young woman with pink hair talking about her suicide attempt is laying underneath the stars, but until she laments that the clouds aren’t moving, you could almost forget that they’re virtual as well. And when the deaf ASL instructor talks about losing his brother during COVID and lights a virtual Japanese lantern in his honor, there’s nothing synthetic about the emotions you feel."

Engadget states, "it’s clear from We Met in Virtual Reality that he’s not just dropping into the community for a quick story. Instead, he sees the humanity behind the avatars and virtual connections." On the other hand, Wired gave a more critical review, noting that the documentary leaves out the drastic ways VR is changing in the wake of competitors such as Meta's conception of the metaverse, stating, "Hunting spends a lot of time showing there’s a culture worth preserving; if only he’d shown if anyone is trying to do it."

According to Polygon, the film's setting and goals were not adequately explained, and its unusual virtual environment distracts from its purpose: "This is a movie meant to introduce viewers to the real emotions people bring to their escapist fantasy worlds. But for most viewers, it’s more likely to simply be a confusing, exhilarating, context-free introduction to the fantasy world itself." Kotaku classifies the visual glitches and choppiness of VRChat, present throughout the film, as a major distraction.

== See also ==
- Grand Theft Hamlet
- Hyperland
- Machinima
- Synthetic Pleasures
- Virtual community
- Vlogger (film)
