= Resonite =

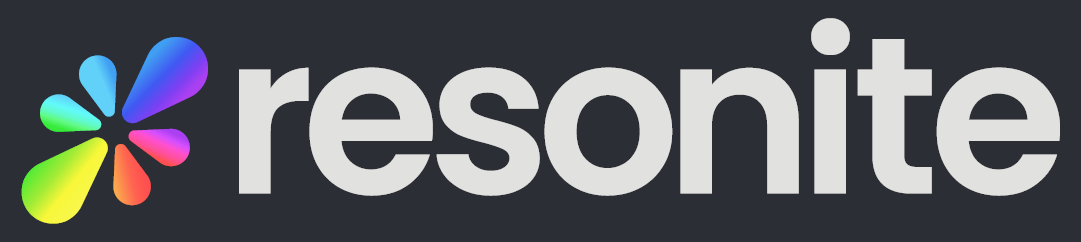
- Developer: Yellow Dog Man Studios
- Publisher: Yellow Dog Man Studios
- Designer: Tomáš “Frooxius” Mariančík
- Engine: Hybrid, FrooxEngine (custom) and Unity
- Platforms: Microsoft Windows, Linux
- Release: October, 2023
- Genre: Social VR
- Modes: Single-player, multiplayer

Resonite is an online virtual world platform created by Tomáš "Frooxius" Mariančík, a Czech developer, and operated by Yellow Dog Man Studios. The platform allows users to interact with others with user-created avatars and worlds, and to integrate and interact with a wide range of items and media. The platform enables users to build and share a wide range of custom 3D content directly within the environment, including avatars, interactive objects, and entire explorable spaces, all of which are crafted and shared by the community. Resonite is designed primarily for use with virtual reality headsets, being available for Microsoft Windows PCs. It also has a "desktop" mode designed for mouse and keyboard, with the ability to switch seamlessly between modes.

Resonite was first released as a Steam early access game on October 6, 2023.

== Features ==
=== Socializing and playing ===
Similar to VRChat, Resonite supports custom avatars, full body tracking, eye and face tracking, and haptics. More features Resonite has are customizable UI, the ability to be present in multiple worlds at the same time, instant messaging, and seamless cross-session carry and transferability for individual or multiple items and it's imports/exports, with persistence across the game.

Sharing media with users is a feature in Resonite, where a user can drag and drop models, pictures, audio, music, or videos into any world for other users to experience. A central feature for managing assets is the game’s inventory system. This cloud-based system allows users to store 3D items and other creations, providing seamless cross-session transfer; saved items retain their persistence and edits, and can be instantly spawned into any world a user visits, essentially allowing users to carry their creations with them across the platform, including avatars. Users can also change their avatar’s scale at any time, unless the host of the session limits it. For discovering worlds, Resonite incorporates a world search and session discovery system, so that users can look for worlds or meet their friends. Resonite natively supports streaming through the use of in-game recording and streaming tools. Custom locomotion is also a feature of Resonite, enabling by default users to fly, noclip, switch to zero-gravity, or build their own customized system.

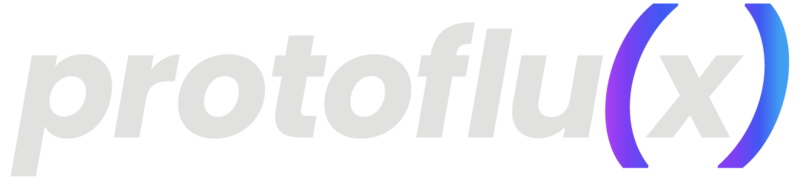
The logo of Resonite's official visual programming language

=== Building and creating ===
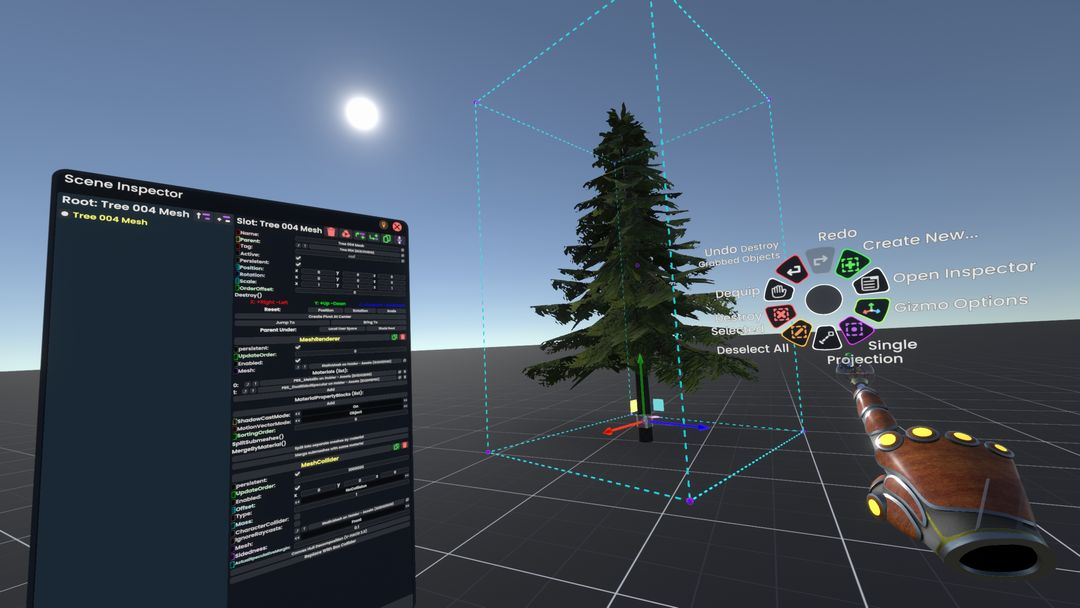
A user using the developer panel (left) to edit the tree (right)

A core design principle of Resonite is the ability for virtually all content to be remixable and editable in real-time. This allows users to deconstruct, learn from, modify, personalize, and combine existing content to create entirely new experiences, tools, and assets directly within the VR environment. Avatars and other 3D content can be built directly in the game without the need for external game engines, enabling real-time collaboration. There are official tools provided by the team to help users build, ranging from brushes to scripting and modeling tools. The tools can also be used to edit almost everything in a world the user is in. Other than tools, Resonite can import and export 3D models, and process textures and audio. A major feature that Resonite has is a visual programming language known as Protoflux. It allows users to build a wide variety of functionality, from simple interactions to complex games and systems, with real-time feedback and collaboration. Protoflux can leverage the platform's networking capabilities to communicate with external applications and online services. This facilitates external API integrations, allowing for features such as first-party Twitch support and user-created connections with platforms like Mastodon and Bluesky. It supports websockets, which lets the code in Resonite communicate with external applications, and async flows, which lets users create code that can yield or wait across different frames. Protoflux also has a storage system for storing computational data in an object in the world.

=== Hybrid Engine ===
Resonite has a unique engine setup that utilizes both Unity and the custom built Froox-Engine made by game creator Tomáš. It communicates via an inter-process communication (IPC) layer called Renderite. Through this IPC model Unity acts as only a puppet to render the scene where as FrooxEngine is the primary game engine doing things like moving players interacting with items and calculating particles. One key feature that this IPC model enables is custom user created renderer replacements and allowing for official replacement of Unity as the renderer at a later date.

== Hardware support ==
Resonite supports various VR headsets such as the Oculus Rift, Oculus Quest, HTC Vive, Valve Index, and Windows Mixed Reality.

== History ==
Before the release of Resonite, there was a game called NeosVR. NeosVR was another game that was made by Frooxius and had the same premise as Resonite. However, there was a longstanding dispute between the then-NeosVR development team and Solirax's CEO, Karel Hulec, over the inclusion of cryptocurrency-related features in the platform, which led to the resignation of Frooxius on April 24, 2023. The remaining development team released a joint statement in Discord on September 22, 2023, saying that they no longer see a path to successful reconciliation.

On July 13, 2023, the development team started a new Patreon page titled Resonite and stated that they are working on a new innovative project. On September 22, 2023, the team made another post, including the first video about the game and a "thank you" message to their sponsors and Patreon supporters. Then, they announced that the game will have an October launch. They also announced that the Steam page, the official website, and the official Discord are officially live on September 23, 2023. On October 6, 2023, the game went live on Steam. A launch live stream also happened on Twitch.

== Community ==
Resonite, due to its nature of building content in the game, has community events based on creating. For instance, there is an event called Creator Jam, a collaborative VR building event. There's also an event called Metaverse Maker Competition, an annual, month-long, team-oriented VR building event. There are also non-English events like UniFesta, an item exhibition festival.

== See also ==
- VRChat — A platform that allows users to interact with others.
- AltspaceVR — A now-defunct platform that provided meeting spaces in virtual reality.
- NeosVR — Spiritual predecessor of Resonite.
