= Delivery =

Delivery may refer to:

== Biology and medicine ==
- Childbirth
- Drug delivery
- Gene delivery

== Business and law ==
- Delivery (commerce), of goods, e.g.:
  - Pizza delivery
  - Milk delivery
  - Food delivery
  - Online grocer
- Deed ("delivery" in contract law), as in "signed, sealed and delivered"
- Power delivery or electricity delivery, the process that goes from generation of electricity in the power station to use by the consumer

== Film and television ==
- Delivering (film), a 1993 short film by Todd Field
- Delivery (1976 film), a Soviet Armenian biographical film
- Delivery (2005 film), an animated short film
- Delivery (2013 film), an American horror film
- The Delivery, a 1999 film directed by Roel Reiné
- "Delivery", the final episode of Men Behaving Badly
- Julia Zemiro's Home Delivery, a 2013 Australian television comedy interview series
- "The Delivery" (The Office), a 2010 episode of The Office
- Delivery (web series), a 2021 South Korean web drama.

== Music ==
- Deliver (The Mamas & the Papas album), 1967
- Deliver (The Oak Ridge Boys album), 1983
- Deliverin', a 1971 album by Poco
- "Deliver" (song), a 2017 song by Fifth Harmony
- "Deliver", a song by Lupe Fiasco from Tetsuo & Youth
- "Delivery" (song), a 2007 single by Babyshambles
- Delivery (British band), a British rock band
- Delivery (Australian band), an Australian garage-punk band

== Other uses ==
- The Delivery (novel), a 2021 novel by Peter Mendelsund
- Delivery (cricket), in cricket, a single action of bowling a cricket ball towards the batsman
- Delivery (joke), of a joke

== See also ==
- Deliverance (disambiguation)
- Delivery service (disambiguation)
