= Microsoft Classroom =

Blended learning platform

- Developer: Microsoft
- Release: April 14, 2016; 10 years ago
- Type: Educational software
- License: Software as service
- Website: education.microsoft.com

Microsoft Classroom was an online blended learning platform for schools that aimed to simplify grading assignments and student communication in a paperless way. It was introduced for Office 365 Education subscribers in April 2016.

On May 18, 2017 Microsoft announced the retirement of Microsoft Classroom, which was completed on January 31, 2018. Some features of Microsoft Classroom became part of Microsoft Teams in Office 365 Education.

== New Microsoft Classroom experience (2026) ==
On November 5, 2026, Microsoft announced a new Microsoft Classroom experience as part of its updated Microsoft 365 Education portfolio. The application provides a dedicated teaching and learning environment, bringing together Assignments, Gradebook, Classwork, Learning Accelerators, Class Notebook and AI-powered features including Teach and the Study and Learn Agent. Microsoft stated that Classroom would complement rather than replace the existing education capabilities of Microsoft Teams.

Unlike Class Teams, the new Microsoft Classroom experience does not include Teams channels, chats or tabs within its native class interface. It continues to use Microsoft 365 Groups for its underlying class structure. The new application is expected to become generally available for the Northern Hemisphere back-to-school period in 2027.
