= Deliverance (disambiguation) =

Deliverance is a 1972 film directed by John Boorman.

Deliverance may also refer to:

== Arts, entertainment, and media ==
=== Film and television ===
- Deliverance (1919 film), a film about Helen Keller
- BloodRayne 2: Deliverance, a 2007 direct-to-video film
- Sadgati ("Salvation" or "Deliverance"), a 1981 Hindi film directed by Satyajit Ray
- "Deliverance" (Doctors), a 2003 television episode
- "Deliverance" (Roseanne), a 1992 television episode
- The Deliverance (film), a 2024 American horror film

=== Music ===
==== Bands ====
- Deliverance (metal band), an American Christian thrash metal band
- Deliverance (rock band), a German–Canadian group

==== Albums ====
- Deliverance by Space (1977)
- Deliverance (Deliverance album) (1989)
- Deliverance (Corrosion of Conformity album) (1994)
- Deliverance (Baby D album) (1996)
- Deliverance (Citizen Kane album) (1999)
- Deliverance (Joi Cardwell album) (1999)
- Deliverance (You Am I album) (2002)
- Deliverance (Opeth album) (2002)
- Deliverance (Bubba Sparxxx album) (2003)
- Deliverance (Quietdrive album) (2008)
- The Deliverance by Sway (2015)

==== Songs ====
- "Deliverance" (Bubba Sparxxx song) (2003)
- "Deliverance" (You Am I song) (2003)
- "Deliverance", 1977 song by Space
- "Deliverance", 1984 song by Queensrÿche from The Warning
- "Deliverance", 1990 song by The Mission from Carved in Sand
- "Deliverance", 1995 song by Earth Crisis from Destroy the Machines
- "Deliverance", 2002 song by Opeth from Deliverance
- "Deliverance", 2003 song by Cult of Luna from The Beyond
- "Deliverance", 2006 song by Firewind from Allegiance
- "Deliverance", 2017 song by Varials from Pain Again
- "Deliverance", 2018 song by CHVRCHES
- "Deliverance", 2020 song by Within the Ruins from Black Heart

=== Video games ===
- Deliverance (video game), a platformer released in 1992
- Deliverance: Stormlord II, by Hewson Consultants
- Kingdom Come: Deliverance, an open-world role-playing game

=== Other media ===
- Mark Rutherford's Deliverance, an 1885 biography by Hale White, under his eponymous pseudonym
- A Deliverance, an 1898 novel by Allan Monkhouse
- Deliverance, a 1920 novel by E. L. Grant Watson
- Deliverance, a 1926 book by J. F. Rutherford
- Deliverance (novel), a 1970 novel by James Dickey; the basis for the 1972 film
- The Deliverance, a 1904 historical novel by Ellen Glasgow

== Military ==
- Deliverance of Vienna, a 1683 defeat of the Ottoman Empire by the Holy League
- Operation Deliverance, the 1992 Canadian Forces mission in Somalia

== Other uses ==
- Deliverance Island (Queensland), in Australia's Torres Strait
- Deliverance ministry, a type of Christian prayer
- Deliverance (collection), a fashion collection by Alexander McQueen

== See also ==
- Delivery (disambiguation)
- Salvation
