= Flip (software) =

Software app

- Former name: Flipgrid (2014–2022)
- Founded: January 2014; 12 years ago
- Successor: Microsoft Teams
- Parent: Microsoft
- Website: flip.com

Flip (formerly Flipgrid and originally Vidku) was a free-to-use video discussion platform bought by Microsoft for use in classroom environments. The platform was available via a web browser, or through a mobile app on iOS and Android devices. Both the website and apps were fully discontinued in October 2024 to be implemented in Microsoft Teams for Education instead. The software allowed teachers to post topics arranged in a grid which contain videos and text-based information, and allowed students to submit their own videos in response. Students and teachers were able to add items to the videos they upload including sticky notes and stickers, and the videos uploaded could include automatically transcribed closed captioning.

Flipgrid could sync to a teacher's already existing Google Classroom roster, and included a library of pre-existing video discussion topics from organizations including NASA, PBS, and the BBC. The platform also allowed for temporary guest speakers to act in a teacher role and to upload videos and topics of their own.

Two 2020 studies that showed that use of the software improved student engagement in online or hybrid classroom environments.

== History ==
Flipgrid was developed by the LT Media Lab at the University of Minnesota and was first released in January 2014 with a subscription based model where teachers would pay for the software and would allow for an unlimited number of students.

Flipgrid was set up as the name of a Minneapolis-based startup company in 2015 to manage and support the software, and was later acquired by Microsoft in June 2018, who then made the software free-to-use for teachers and refunded any teachers who had an existing subscription. At the time of its acquisition, Flipgrid was used by more than 20 million students across more than 180 countries. Microsoft announced on June 27, 2022 at the 2022 International Society for Technology in Education (ISTE) Conference ISTELive, during an event they called FlipFest, that Flipgrid would be renamed to Flip.

In June 2024, Microsoft announced that the Flip software and website would be retired in favor of similar features in Microsoft Teams for Education, with all existing content to be deleted during the month of October 2024.
