= Paul Janz =

Canadian theologian and former musician (born 1951)

- Born: Paul Janz; 1951 (age 74–75); Three Hills, Alberta, Canada
- Genres: Pop-rock, contemporary Christian
- Occupations: Professor of theology, former musician
- Years active: 1970–1993

Paul Janz (born 1951) is a Canadian theologian who was formerly a prominent singer-songwriter of pop rock music in the mainstream and contemporary Christian markets. He is known for such hits as "Every Little Tear", "One Night", "All I Have", "One Last Lie", "Believe In Me", "Go to Pieces", "Rocket to My Heart", "Close My Eyes", "Stand", "Prince Of Pain King Of Fools" and "I Won't Cry".

== Career ==
Janz began his music career in the 1970s with his brother, cousin, and friends in several bands under the names Danny and Paul, Danny Paul and Wayne, the Janz Team Singers and, finally, Deliverance. Brought up in a Mennonite family, he first learned the trumpet and by age 13 was engaged with his local chapter of the Salvation Army.

Interested in Gospel music and rock, combined with a broad interest in music saw him record four albums with Deliverance in four years. These were successful in Germany and included 1979's Leaving LA which reached No. 56 on Billboard. In 1984, he launched his solo career, which culminated in four projects with a string of chart-topping hits from each album. The first solo album recorded at Greenhouse Studios in Vancouver would achieve gold record status in Canada.

In 1986, Michael Godin, who was vice president of A&R with A&M Records Canada, left to become Janz's manager. The success of his projects led to his nomination for a Juno Award, Canada's most prominent music award. Despite achieving great success in Canada, his U.S. record label's restructuring of its roster of artists led to the end of promotion in the American market.

Janz's final project, Trust, which was recorded under a co-partnership with the Attic Records label, continued the same lyrical compositions and melodic rhythms. Since that time, Janz has not released any new material.

In 1981, he took part in the German selection for the Eurovision Song Contest with the song "Steine (Stones)". He finished tenth behind musicians like Taco and Peter Cornelius. Instead, Lena Valaitis was selected to represent Germany at the Eurovision Song Contest 1981 with the song "Johnny Blue". The song has also been recorded in English with his band Deliverance, a longer version titled "Last Road to Forever".

In 1989, Songwriter was released, an album distributed by the publisher, Irving Music of Canada, to promote Janz's songs to other artists and producers, not intended for commercial release.

Prior to retiring, he was the Professor Emeritus of Philosophical Theology and Head of the Department of Theology and Religious Studies at King's College London. He formerly taught philosophy at Trinity Western University in Langley, British Columbia, and has written a book entitled God, the Mind's Desire: Reference, Reason and Christian Thinking published by Cambridge University Press.

In 2004, Janz's first album, High Strung, was re-released on CD for the first time by Escape Music in the UK. More recently, he has launched a new brand, Transformation Theology, a remake of Bonhoeffer's grass-root theology.

His son Chris Janz was a recording artist and GMA Canada Covenant Award winning songwriter and Covenant Award-nominated producer. Chris died in Abbotsford, British Columbia on December 14, 2016.

== Discography ==
=== Studio albums ===
- High Strung (1985)
- Electricity (1987)
- Renegade Romantic (1990)
- Trust (1992)

=== Compilation albums ===
- Presence: A Collection of Hit Singles (1992)

=== Promotional albums ===
- Songwriter (1989)

=== with Deliverance ===
- To God Be the Glory (1976)
- Give It a Try (1977)
- Lasting Impressions (1978)
- Tightrope (1979)

=== Singles ===
Title	Release	Peak chart positions	Album
Title	Release	CAN	Album
"Go to Pieces"	1985	29	High Strung
"Don't Cry Tonight"	1985	—	High Strung
"High Strung"	1985	85	High Strung
"Close My Eyes"	1985	94	High Strung
"One Night (Is All it Takes)"	1987	67	Electricity
"Believe in Me"	1988	26	Electricity
"I Won't Cry"	1988	63	Electricity
"Send Me a Miracle"	1988	74	Electricity
"Every Little Tear"	1990	5	Renegade Romantic
"Rocket to My Heart"	1990	12	Renegade Romantic
"Stand"	1990	13	Renegade Romantic
"Hold Me Tender"	1991	41	Renegade Romantic
"This Love Is Forever"	1992	44	Presence: A Collection of Hit Singles
"Wind Me Up"	1992	30	Trust
"Amazon Rain"	1993	28	Trust
"Calling My Personal Angel"	1993	65	Trust
"—" denotes a recording that did not chart.

"Believe in Me" also reached No. 25 on the U.S. Billboard Adult Contemporary chart in 1987.

== Notes ==
1. "God, the Mind's Desire – Cambridge University Press". Archived from the original on March 5, 2005.
