= Delivery service =

Delivery service may refer to:

- Package delivery (or parcel delivery)
- Food delivery
- Service delivery framework, a set of business standards
