= Deliverance (rock band) =

German-Canadian Christian pop and rock music band of the 1970s

- Origin: Canada, Germany
- Genre: Pop rock
- Years active: 1974–1981
- Label: Global Records
- Past members: Ken Janz; Danny Janz; Paul Janz; Guy Roellinger; Dave McSparran; Herb Rempel; Paul Barnard; Vern Giesbrecht; Doug Virgin; Wayne Quiring

Deliverance was a German-Canadian Christian pop and rock music band that was active in the 1970s until 1981.

== History ==
Danny Janz, Ken Janz, and Paul Janz formed Deliverance in Lörrach, Germany though the three were from Calgary, Canada. All three were raised in Basel, Switzerland and attended Black Forest Academy. Danny and Paul Janz had already performed together as "Danny and Paul" but joined with Ken Janz, Herb Rempel, and Vern Giesbrecht from the "Janz Team Singers" in 1974 to form Deliverance – combining the "Janz Team Singers" with "Danny, Paul & Wayne" and created a dynamic new band. Paul Barnard, Doug Virgin, Guy Roellinger and Dave McSparran also joined the band during its history. The band released four albums before Paul Janz embarked on a solo career.

The group had a minor hit in 1979 with "Leaving L.A.", which reached No. 71 on the Billboard Hot 100.

After legal troubles concerning the band's name and a copyright suit the band named itself Janz and recorded a single in 1981 titled "Steine", which went No. 1 in German Charts. Still they were advised by their attorney not to record a full-length album yet. The band parted shortly after that when Paul Janz left Germany to go back to Canada.

== Discography ==
=== Studio albums ===
- To God Be the Glory (1976)
- Give It a Try (1977)
- Lasting Impressions (1978)
- Tightrope (1979)

=== Singles ===
| Title | Release | Peak chart positions | | Album |
| Title | Release | CAN | US | Album |
|---|---|---|---|---|
| "Leaving L.A." | 1980 | 57 | 71 | Tightrope |

=== Related singles ===
- Janz Team Singers and Danny & Paul – "Ein wunderbares Heil" (1971)
- Janz Team Singers and Danny & Paul – "Reach Out to Jesus" (1971)
- Janz Team Singers and Danny & Paul – "Ohne Jesus" (1972)
- Janz – "Steine" (1981)
