= Microsoft Teams =

Team collaboration application

- Microsoft Teams' channel tab, as seen on the Web app
- Developer: Microsoft
- Release: March 14, 2017; 9 years ago

Stable release(s) [±]
- Windows: 26288.2004 (Build 5269.3420) / November 5, 2026; 16 days ago
- macOS: 26289.204 (Build 5281.6363) / November 5, 2026; 16 days ago
- Web: October 2026 Update (26101515220) / November 6, 2026; 15 days ago
- Android: 1416/1.0.0.2026074102 / April 28, 2026; 6 months ago
- iOS (Note: Including iPadOS and visionOS): 8.20 / November 7, 2026; 14 days ago
- Windows (Classic, discontinued): 1.8.00.21151 / August 6, 2025; 15 months ago
- macOS (Classic, discontinued): 1.8.00.21151 / August 6, 2025; 15 months ago
- Web (Classic, discontinued): July 2025 Update (1.0.0.2025070703) / July 14, 2025; 16 months ago
- Linux, discontinued: 1.5.00.23861 / September 19, 2022; 4 years ago
- Written in: TypeScript, Angular, React; 1.0: Electron; 2.0: Microsoft Edge WebView2
- Operating system: Windows 10, 11; macOS 14+; Web; Android 11+; iOS 17+ (Note: Including iPadOS); visionOS 1+
- Predecessor: Microsoft Classroom, MindAlign, Skype for Business, Skype, Flip
- Available in: 48 languages
- List of languages English, Arabic, Bengali, Bulgarian, Catalan, Croatian, Czech, Danish, Dutch, Estonian, Filipino, Finnish, French, German, Greek, Gujarati, Hebrew, Hindi, Hungarian, Icelandic, Indonesian, Italian, Japanese, Kannada, Korean, Latvian, Lithuanian, Malayalam, Marathi, Norwegian Bokmål, Norwegian Nynorsk, Polish, Portuguese, Romanian, Russian, Serbian, Simplified Chinese, Slovak, Slovenian, Spanish, Swedish, Tamil, Telugu, Thai, Traditional Chinese, Turkish, Ukrainian and Vietnamese.
- Type: Collaborative software
- License: Proprietary commercial cloud software
- Website: teams.cloud.microsoft

Microsoft Teams is a team collaboration platform developed by Microsoft as part of the Microsoft 365 suite. It offers various features such as workspace chat, video conferencing, file storage, and integration with both Microsoft and third-party applications and services. Teams gradually replaced earlier Microsoft messaging and collaboration platforms, including Skype for Business, Skype, Flip, and Microsoft Classroom.

The platform saw significant growth during the COVID-19 pandemic, alongside competitors such as Zoom, Slack, and Google Meet, as organizations shifted to remote work and virtual meetings.

As of January 2023, Microsoft reported approximately 280 million monthly active users.

== History ==
On August 29, 2007, Microsoft acquired Parlano, the developer of the persistent group chat tool MindAlign. Years later, on March 4, 2016, Microsoft considered acquiring Slack for $8 billion. However, the proposal was reportedly opposed by Bill Gates, who advocated for focusing on enhancing Skype for Business instead. Lu Qi, then executive vice president of Applications and Services, had led the initiative to pursue the Slack acquisition. Following Lu's departure later that year, Microsoft announced Microsoft Teams on November 2, 2016, at an event in New York City, positioning it as a direct competitor to Slack. Teams launched worldwide on March 14, 2017. The service was initially led by corporate vice president Brian MacDonald and Chester Clamp.

In response to the launch, Slack published a full-page advertisement in The New York Times welcoming the competition and outlining its product philosophy. Although Slack was used by 28 companies in the Fortune 100, The Verge wrote that executives would question paying for the service if Teams provides a similar function in their company's existing Office 365 subscription. However, ZDNET noted that the platforms initially served different markets, as Teams did not support external users, making it less appealing to small businesses and freelancers, a limitation Microsoft later addressed. In response to Teams' announcement, Slack deepened in-product integration with Google services.

In May 2017, Microsoft announced that Teams would replace Microsoft Classroom in Office 365 Education. A free version of Teams was released on July 12, 2018, offering most core features at no cost, albeit with limits on users and storage. In January 2019, Microsoft introduced updates targeting "Firstline Workers" to improve Teams’ performance across shared or limited-access devices.

In September 2019, Microsoft announced the retirement of Skype for Business in favor of Teams, which took effect on July 31, 2021. In early 2020, Microsoft introduced a push-to-talk "Walkie Talkie" feature aimed at firstline workers using smartphones and tablets over Wi-Fi or cellular networks.

The COVID-19 pandemic significantly boosted usage of Teams. On March 19, 2020, Microsoft reported 44 million daily active users. In April, the platform logged 4.1 billion meeting minutes in a single day.

A public preview of Microsoft Teams for Linux was released in December 2019, but the Linux client was discontinued in 2022. In July 2020, Microsoft shut down its video game livestreaming platform Mixer, and announced that some of its technologies would be repurposed for use in Teams.

On February 28, 2025, Microsoft announced that Skype would be fully retired on May 5, 2025, with users given options to export their data or transition to Microsoft Teams.

In October 2025, together with other Microsoft 365 suite apps, Teams had its logo updated.

== Usage ==
Active user numbers
July 11, 2019	13 million daily
November 19, 2019	20 million daily
March 12, 2020	32 million daily
March 19, 2020	44 million daily
April 29, 2020	75 million daily
April 27, 2021	145 million daily
July 27, 2021	250 million monthly
January 25, 2022	270 million monthly
July 18, 2023	300 million monthly
March 26, 2024	320 million monthly
June 2025	360 million monthly

== Underlying software ==
Microsoft Teams, as part of the Microsoft 365 suite, utilizes SharePoint and Exchange Online. Each Team, Shared Channel, and Private Channel has its own Microsoft 365 Group and SharePoint Site used for file storage.

Messages are stored in Cosmos DB and are journaled to Exchange Online mailboxes. Private messages, including messages in Private Channels, are journaled to the sender and recipients' mailboxes. Public Channel messages are journaled to their corresponding Team's group mailbox, whereas, messages from Shared Channels are journaled to their own mailboxes.

Contacts and voicemail are stored in Exchange Online.

Microsoft Teams client is a web-based desktop app, originally developed on top of the Electron framework which combines the Chromium rendering engine and the Node.js JavaScript platform. Version 2.0 client was rebuilt using the Evergreen version of Microsoft Edge WebView2 in place of Electron.

== Features ==
=== Chats ===
Teams allows users to communicate in two-way persistent chats with one or multiple participants. Participants can message using text, emojis, stickers and GIFs, as well as sharing links and files. In August 2022, the chat feature was updated for "chat with yourself"; allowing for the organization of files, notes, comments, images, and videos within a private chat tab.

=== Teams ===
Teams allows communities, groups, or teams to contribute in a shared workspace where messages and digital content on a specific topic are shared. Team members can join through an invitation sent by a team administrator or owner or sharing of a specific URL. Teams for Education allows admins and teachers to set up groups for classes, professional learning communities (PLCs), staff members, and everyone.

=== Channels ===
Channels allow team members to communicate without the use of email or group SMS (texting). Users can reply to posts with text, images, GIFs, and image macros. Direct messages send private messages to designated users rather than the entire channel. Connectors can be used within a channel to submit information contacted through a third-party service. Connectors include Mailchimp, Facebook Pages, Twitter, Power BI and Bing News.

=== Group conversations ===
Ad-hoc groups can be created to share instant messaging, audio calls (VoIP), and video calls inside the client software.

=== Telephone replacement ===
A feature on one of the higher cost licencing tiers allows connectivity to the public switched telephone network (PSTN) telephone system. This allows users to use Teams as if it were a telephone, making and receiving calls over the PSTN, including the ability to host "conference calls" with multiple participants.

=== Meeting ===
Meetings can be scheduled with multiple participants able to share audio, video, chat and presented content with all participants. Multiple users can connect via a meeting link. Automated minutes are possible using the recording and transcript features. Teams has a plugin for Microsoft Outlook to schedule a Teams Meeting in Outlook for a specific date and time and invite others to attend. If a meeting is scheduled within a channel, users visiting the channel are able to see if a meeting is in progress.

==== Teams Live Events ====
Teams Live Events replaces Skype Meeting Broadcast for users to broadcast to 10,000 participants on Teams, Yammer, or Microsoft Stream.

==== Breakout Rooms ====
Breakout rooms split a meeting into small groups. This is often utilized for collaboration during trainings or any environment where having all participants speak at once could be disruptive or unfeasible. Breakout rooms can be set by the hosts to a certain length of time, after which all participants will automatically rejoin the main meeting room.

==== Front Row ====
Front Row adjusts the layout of the viewer's screen, placing the speaker or content in the center of the gallery with other meeting participant's video feeds reduced in size and located below the speaker.

=== Education ===
Microsoft Teams for Education allows teachers to distribute, provide feedback, and grade student assignments turned in via Teams using the Assignments tab through Office 365 for Education subscribers. Quizzes can also be assigned to students through an integration with Office Forms.

=== Protocols ===
Microsoft Teams is based on a number of Microsoft-specific protocols. Video conferences are realized over the protocol MNP24, known from the Skype consumer version. VoIP and video conference clients based on SIP and H.323 need special gateways to connect to Microsoft Teams servers. With the help of Interactive Connectivity Establishment (ICE), clients behind Network address translation routers and restrictive firewalls are also able to connect, if peer-to-peer is not possible.

=== Integrations ===
Microsoft Teams has integrations through Microsoft AppSource, its integration marketplace. In 2020, Microsoft partnered with KUDO, a cloud-based solution with language interpretation, to allow integrated language meeting controls. In June 2022, an update was released using AI to improve call audio through the elimination of background feedback loops and cancelling non-vocal audio.

== Anti-trust controversy ==
In July 2023, the European Commission opened an anti-trust investigation into the possibility that Microsoft unfairly used its office suite market power to increase sales of Teams and hurt its competitors. The next month, Microsoft announced it would make Teams an optional part of the Microsoft 365 bundle, and provide more information to software developers to allow Teams users to transition to competing software with their Teams data. In early 2023, Microsoft updated Teams to open links from chats in Microsoft Edge instead of the default browser set by the user. In June 2024, the EU Commission charged Microsoft with antitrust violations for bundling Microsoft Teams into the Office suite.

== See also ==
- Comparison of web conferencing software
- Innovative Communications Alliance
- Microsoft Mesh
- Microsoft NetMeeting
- Microsoft Office Live Meeting
- Windows Meeting Space
- Azure DevOps Server
