= Wego =

Wego, WeGo, or WEGO may refer to:

- WEGO (Niagara Falls), transit system in Niagara Falls, Ontario, Canada
- Wego.com, a Singapore-based travel search engine
- USS Wego (SP-1196), a United States Navy patrol boat in commission from 1917 to 1919
- TVS Wego, a motor scooter manufactured by TVS Motor
- Chiang Wei-kuo (1916–1997), or Wego Chiang, a son of Chiang Kai-shek
- The Wego twins, characters from the animated Kim Possible series; see List of Kim Possible characters
- The turn-based WeGo system, an approach for time-keeping in games
- WeGo Public Transit, a moniker used for the Nashville Metropolitan Transit Authority
  - WeGo Star, a commuter rail line between Nashville and Lebanon, Tennessee
- WeGo, a paratransit ride sharing service of the Gainesville, Georgia city government.

== Radio callsigns ==
- WEGO (AM), a defunct radio station (1410 AM) formerly licensed to serve Concord, North Carolina, United States
- WTOB (AM), a radio station (980 AM) licensed to serve Winston-Salem, North Carolina, which held the call sign WEGO from 2009 to 2016
- WPEG, licensed to Concord, North Carolina, which once used the call letters WEGO-FM

== See also ==
- Ouigo, a train service in France
