= AltspaceVR =

Virtual reality social platform

- Developers: Microsoft; now SideQuest
- Release: May 2015 - March 2023; relaunched September 2026
- Operating system: Windows 10, Windows 11, Oculus Quest
- Type: Virtual reality community
- Website: altvr.app

Screen recording of AltspaceVR in March 2023

AltspaceVR is a social Virtual reality (VR) platform initially founded in 2013 by Eric Romo and launched in May 2015. In 2017 it was acquired by Microsoft and became part of the Mixed Reality division (alongside notable products like HoloLens and HoloLens 2) within the Cloud and AI group. Some elements of the platform appear in Microsoft Mesh. In January 2023, Microsoft announced on the AltspaceVR homepage that the service would be shutting down on March 10, 2023. The owner of SideQuest acquired the rights to the AltspaceVR trademark in mid-2026 with plans to relaunch the metaverse platform in late 2026. On November 7, 2026, AltspaceVR became available as an Early Access Game on Steam.

The platform largely consists of user-generated spaces called "worlds", which can be visited by other users. Individuals can gather, talk, collaborate, and be co-present in small to large groups.

The platform is regularly home to a wide variety of live virtual events, including from VR church and LGBTQI+ meetups to large business conferences and magic shows.

== Overview ==
AltspaceVR is organized in spaces called "worlds", which can be found and accessed via a floating menu or via in-world "teleporters". Some large worlds, such as the "Campfire", were built and maintained by official developers as places for users to meet and interact. In May 2022, AltspaceVR removed all developer-maintained worlds.

Altspace's internal menus include a list of "featured" user-defined worlds and a real-time list of the most "popular" worlds, arranged by the number of users currently visiting each world. Other menus listed current and planned "events", which took place inside official or user-generated worlds.

In 2020 AltspaceVR hosted BRCvr, a Burning Man event.

In July 2026, Shane Harris, the founder/CEO of SideQuestVR, made a Reddit post announcing that SideQuest had acquired the rights to the AltspaceVR name, and that they will be releasing a "spiritual successor" of the app in the fall of 2026.

In September 2026, the relaunched AltspaceVR was updated and released as a downloadable beta program for creators to begin uploading and testing their worlds. By late October 2026 the first multiplayer version was made available.

== Supported hardware ==
AltspaceVR previously supported several VR headsets:

- SteamVR devices (HTC Vive, Valve Index...)
- Oculus Rift/Rift-S via Oculus Store
- Oculus Quest 2
- Windows Mixed Reality devices
- Samsung Gear VR (discontinued mid-2020)
- Oculus Go (discontinued 2020)
- Google Daydream (discontinued 2019)

The platform was available initially as a traditional desktop application for Mac and Windows, and had a non-VR Android app until 2019.

As of November 2026, the relaunched AltspaceVR now supports:

- SteamVR devices (HTC Vive, Valve Index...)
- Oculus Quest 2 and Meta Quest 3/3s
- Desktop PC (Windows 10 and Windows 11)

== See also ==
- Horizon Worlds
- Resonite - A social VR game with in-game building features.
