= HTC Vive XR Elite =

Virtual reality headset

VIVE XR Elite
- Developer: HTC
- Type: Mixed Reality Headset
- Released: 2023
- CPU: Qualcomm Snapdragon XR 2 chipset
- Memory: 12GB RAM, 128GB storage
- Display: LCD 1920 × 1920 per eye @ 90 Hz, up to 110-degree FOV
- Platform: PC-Compatible, Android Screen Mirroring capable
- Weight: 625g

VIVE XR Elite is an extended reality (XR) headset developed and manufactured by HTC. Released in February 2023, the headset combines virtual reality (VR) and mixed reality (MR) functionalities.

== Overview ==
HTC Corporation introduced the VIVE XR Elite at the 2023 Consumer Electronics Show (CES) in Las Vegas in January 2023 with the product becoming available later in February. The headset is designed to operate as a standalone device, eliminating the need for external hardware or a PC connection. It has two LCD panels and offers a resolution of 1920 × 1920 pixels per eye and features a 90 Hz refresh rate and a field of view up to 110 degrees.

At launch, the VIVE XR Elite was supported by a range of applications and games available on the HTC VIVEPORT platform. Titles available at launch included Hubris, Yuki, Maestro, Les Mills Body Combat, among others.

== Specifications ==
The VIVE XR Elite is powered by a Qualcomm Snapdragon XR2 processor, and is equipped with 12 GB of RAM and 128 GB of storage. It includes a full-color RGB passthrough camera and four wide field-of-view (FOV) cameras for tracking. The device supports various connectivity methods, including USB-C and Wi-Fi, and is compatible with a range of Android smartphones.

The headset's battery cradle is removable, facilitating a hot-swappable battery system that offers up to 2 hours of battery life. The device is noted for its lightweight design, weighing 625 grams with the battery included.

The headset includes a lens diopter adjustment feature for near-sighted users and an adjustable slider for setting interpupillary distance (IPD), with a range of 54-73 mm, accommodating up to a -6 prescription.

The VIVE XR Elite features a depth sensor for room scanning, allowing automatic detection of desks and walls.

== Accessories ==
HTC offers various accessories for the VIVE XR Elite, including the VIVE Wrist Tracker to augment hand tracking, VIVE Controllers for the use of traditional game controls with the device, a VIVE Streaming Cable for PC VR connection, and VIVE Temple Pads which are more lightweight than the standard headset. Additionally, a VIVE Face Gasket is available for increased comfort and hygiene during extended use.

== User experience ==
The VIVE XR Elite has been praised for its modular and ergonomic design, offering long-term comfort and portability. Its lightweight build, adjustable fit, and diopter correction features are frequently cited as user-friendly advantages, particularly for extended VR or MR sessions.
