= MindAlign =

Parlano MindAlign is a group chat software used as an alternative to email for large enterprises. MindAlign is used most notably in the financial services industry.

== Early history ==
The software was originally developed at UBS AG as an internal group chat solution. The product was sold to Parlano Inc, in the year 2000.

== History and Acquisition ==
Upon the acquisition of Parlano by Microsoft in 2007. Microsoft sold MindAlign 6 (the latest released version at that time) to Aditi Technologies Ltd in the same year. When Aditi acquired MindAlign in 2007, it inherited 56 of its customers, which included 5 of the top 7 global banks.
