= International Conference on Applied Human Factors and Ergonomics =

- Abbreviation: AHFE
- Discipline: Human factors and ergonomics

Publication details
- Publisher: AHFE International
- History: 1996—
- Frequency: annual (as of 2014)

The International Conference on Applied Human Factors and Ergonomics (AHFE) is an academic multi-conference that includes several affiliated conferences, jointly held under one management and one registration. The conference provides an international forum for the exchange of scientific information on theoretical, generic, and applied areas of ergonomics, including physical ergonomics, cognitive and neuroergonomics, social and occupational ergonomics, affective and pleasurable design, and systems engineering. The conference includes keynote presentations, parallel sessions, poster sessions, tutorials, exhibits, and special interest meetings. Submissions are peer-reviewed and published in the conference proceedings; select papers are also expanded and published in AHFE Edited Conference Books.

== Affiliated Conferences ==
The number of conferences affiliated with AHFE has grown since its inception. For 2016, the AHFE affiliated conferences include:

- International Conference on Design for Inclusion
- international Symposium on Cognitive Computing
- International Conference on Human Factors in Management and Leadership
- International Conference on Human Factors in Cybersecurity
- International Conference on Human Factors and Systems Interaction
- International Conference on Human Factors in Robots and Unmanned Systems
- International Conference on Human Factors in Sports and Outdoor Recreation
- International Conference on Human Factors in Energy: Oil, Gas, Nuclear and Electric Power Industries
- International Conference on Human Factors, Business Management and Society
- International Symposium on Human Factors in Training, Education, and Learning Sciences
- International IBM Symposium on Human Factors, Software, and Systems Engineering
- International Conference on Safety Management and Human Factors
- International Conference on Human Factors and Sustainable Infrastructure
- International Conference on The Human Side of Service Engineering
- International Conference on Affective and Pleasurable Design
- International Conference on Human Factors in Transportation
- International Conference on Ergonomics in Design
- International Conference on Human Factors and Ergonomics in Healthcare
- International Conference on Cross-Cultural Decision Making
- International Conference on Applied Digital Human Modeling and Simulation
- International Conference on The Human Aspects of Advanced Manufacturing (HAAMAHA): Managing Enterprise of the Future

== History ==
The AHFE international conference was founded by Gavriel Salvendy, who continues to serve as its overall Scientific Advisor. Originally, the conference was named the International Conference on Applied Ergonomics, and the First International Conference on Applied Ergonomics (ICAE '96) was held in 1996. The second conference was not held until 12 years later, and it was renamed under its current name "AHFE International Conference".

After the second conference, AHFE was held every-other year. At the 2014 conference, organizers announced that they would begin holding it annually.

== Past AHFE conferences ==
Past and future AHFE conferences include:

Year	City	Country	Dates	Attendance	Link
2016	Orlando	(United States) US	27–31 July	Forthcoming	http://www.ahfe.org
2015	Las Vegas	(United States) US	26–30 July	Unreported	http://www.ahfe.org
2014	Kraków	Poland	19–23 July	≈1400 attendees	http://www.ahfe.org
2012	San Francisco	(United States) US	21–25 July	1,539 attendees	No longer active
2010	Miami	(United States) US	17–20 July	≈1000 attendees	No longer active
2008	Las Vegas	(United States) US	14–18 July	≈700 attendees	No longer active
1996	Istanbul	Turkey	21–24 May	Unreported	No longer active
