= Oculus Quest =

Virtual reality headset

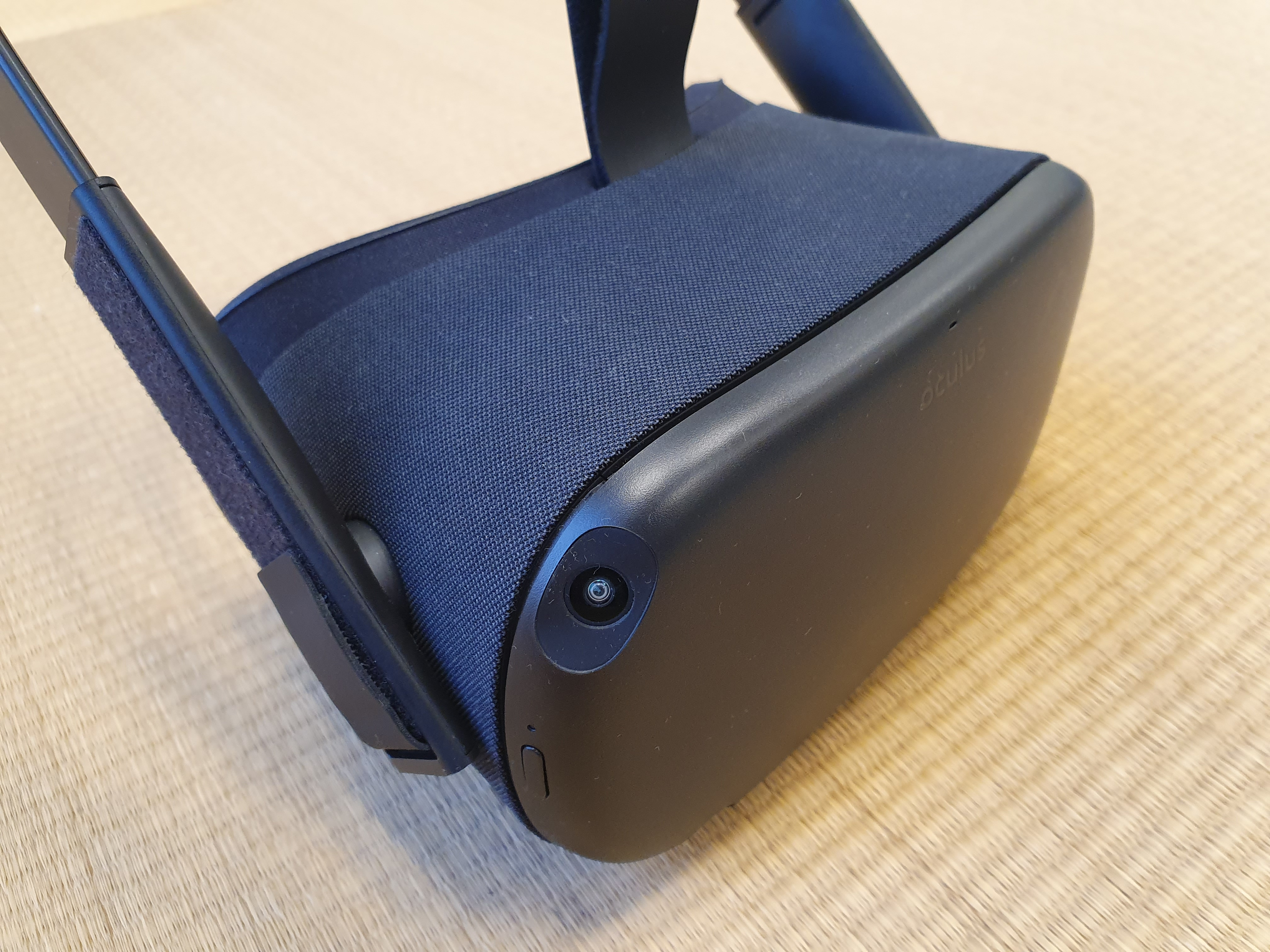
- Oculus Quest
- Codename: Monterey
- Developer: Oculus VR
- Type: Virtual reality headset
- Released: May 21, 2019
- Lifespan: 2019–2024
- Introductory price: US$399 (64 GB); US$499 (128 GB)
- Discontinued: September 2020
- Operating system: Quest system software, based on Android source code. Original: Android 7.1.1 "Nougat" Current: Android 10
- System on a chip: Qualcomm Snapdragon 835
- CPU: 4x Kryo 280 Gold (ARM Cortex-A73 based) @ 2.45 GHz + 4x Kryo 280 Silver (ARM Cortex-A73 based) @ 1.9 GHz
- Memory: 4 GB LPDDR4X
- Storage: 64 GB, 128 GB
- Display: PenTile OLED 1440 × 1600 per eye @ 72 Hz
- Graphics: Adreno 540 @ 670 MHz (Up to 343 GFLOPS FP32)
- Sound: Integrated stereo speakers; 2 × 3.5 mm headphone jack
- Input: 6DOF inside-out tracking through 4 built-in cameras
- Controller input: Oculus Touch
- Camera: 4 cameras
- Connectivity: USB-C; Bluetooth 5; Wi-Fi 5
- Online services: Quest Store
- Weight: 571 g (20.1 oz)
- Predecessor: Oculus Go
- Successor: Oculus Quest 2
- Related: Oculus Rift S
- Website: oculus.com/quest

The first-generation Oculus Quest is a virtual reality headset developed by Oculus (now Reality Labs), a brand of Facebook, Inc., and released on May 21, 2019. Similar to its predecessor, Oculus Go, it is a standalone device, that can run games and software wirelessly under an Android-based operating system. It supports positional tracking with six degrees of freedom, using internal sensors and an array of cameras in the front of the headset rather than external sensors. The cameras are also used as part of the safety feature "Passthrough", which shows a view from the cameras when the user exits their designated boundary area known as "Guardian". A later software update added "Oculus Link", a feature that allows Oculus Rift-compatible software and games to be streamed to the headset from a PC over USB.

The Oculus Quest received praise for its price and convenience, and for having improved graphical fidelity and tracking over Oculus Go, but was panned for its front-heavy build and downgraded graphics quality over PC-based VR games. At launch, it also faced criticism for being limited to software available on the Oculus Store, and not having backwards compatibility with Oculus Go software. However, the introduction of Oculus Link led to reappraisals of the Quest, with critics praising the device's increased flexibility, and foreseeing the Quest as the main Oculus product line going forward. A successor, the Oculus Quest 2, was released in 2020.

== History ==
At Oculus Connect 3 in 2016, Facebook CEO Mark Zuckerberg revealed that Oculus was working on a standalone virtual reality headset codenamed "Santa Cruz". At Oculus Connect 4 the following year, it was announced that Oculus planned to issue software development kits for the new model in 2018. They also revealed the accompanying controllers, which would be similar to the Oculus Rift's touch controllers.

In 2018 at Connect 5, it was announced that the new headset would be known as the Oculus Quest and would be priced at US$399. At F8 2019 it was announced that the Quest would ship on May 21, 2019. At launch, the device was priced at US$399 for the 64 GB version, and US$499 for the 128 GB version.

A successor model, the Oculus Quest 2, was announced on September 16, 2020. It was released on October 13 starting at $299 for the 64GB version and $399 for the 128 GB version. Software support for the first-generation Quest began to be phased out in 2023, with support for certain social features ending in March 2023, and updates limited to maintenance and security patches until 2024.

== Specifications ==
The Oculus Quest uses a Qualcomm Snapdragon 835 system-on-chip (SoC) with 4 GB of RAM. Three of the four 2.3 GHz CPU cores of the chip are reserved for software, while the remaining core and its four lower-power cores are reserved for motion tracking and other background functions. It runs operating system software based on Android Open Source Project (AOSP) source code, with modifications to enhance performance in VR applications. A smartphone running the Oculus app is required in order to conduct first-time setup.

A diamond Pentile OLED display is used for each eye, with an individual resolution of 1440 × 1600 and a refresh rate of 72 Hz. The headset uses the "next generation" lens technology originally introduced in Oculus Go, which helps to enlarge the sweet spot of the lens. Visual artifacts such as God rays are less prominent but still visible in scenes with high contrast. It also features physical interpupillary distance (IPD) adjustment.

=== Tracking ===
Unlike the Oculus Go, which used a limited handheld remote that only supported limited motion tracking, the Quest supports positional tracking with six degrees of freedom (compared to the Go's three).

Rather than use external sensor cameras in the play area to spatially track the headset and controllers (as was the case with the original Oculus Rift CV1), Oculus Quest utilizes an "inside-out" tracking system known as "Oculus Insight". Based on the concept of simultaneous localization and mapping (SLAM), infrared diodes on the Oculus Touch controllers are tracked via four wide-angle cameras built into the front of the headset. This is combined with accelerometer input from the controllers and headset, as well as AI algorithms to predict the path of motion when the controllers are outside of the cameras' field of view.

The cameras are also used as part of a safety feature known as "Passthrough", which displays a grayscale view from the cameras when the player exits their defined playing area. At Oculus Connect 6, it was announced that the feature would be upgraded to "Passthrough+" as on the Oculus Rift S (which also uses Insight), making it stereoscopic and stereo-correct. A "Passthrough on Demand" feature was added in Quest system software version 15, allowing the user to quickly access the Passthrough view by double-tapping the left or right side of the headset.

=== Hand tracking ===
During Oculus Connect 6, it was announced that hand tracking would be added to the Quest in early-2020, utilizing machine learning, Oculus Insight, and "model-based tracking" to recognize the position and gesture of the user's hands without additional hardware.

Hand tracking was initially introduced as an experimental feature in December 2019, as part of Quest system software version 12. It was limited to the main user interface and selected built-in apps, such as the web browser. It was also announced that the Oculus Quest SDK would be updated to add support for the feature. In May 2020, hand tracking exited beta, and became available for use in third-party software beginning May 28.

=== Controllers ===
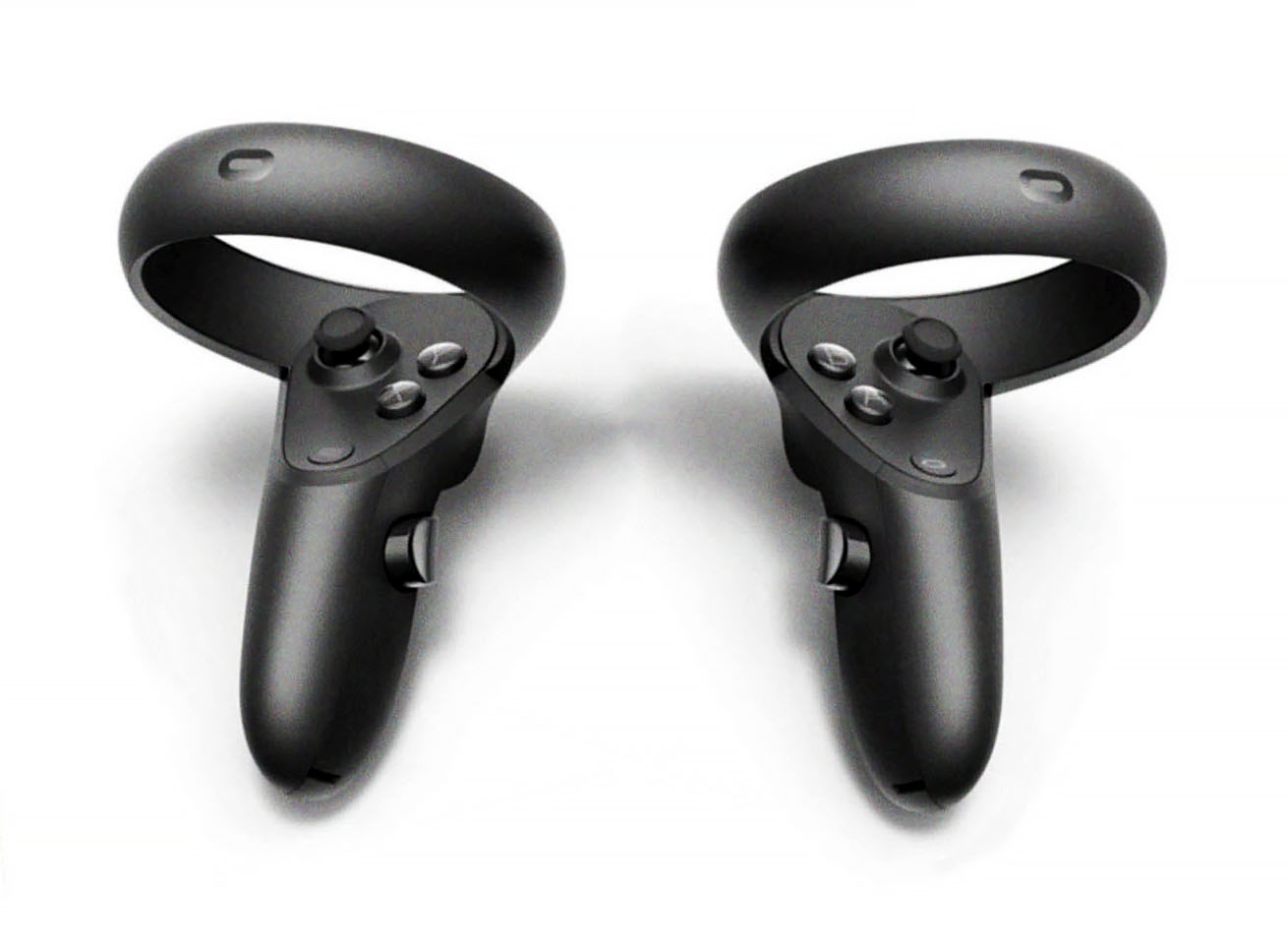
Second-generation Oculus Touch controllers

The Oculus Quest uses second-generation Oculus Touch controllers. Their designs were modified to accommodate Oculus Insight, with their tracking rings moved from the back of the controllers to their tops so that they can be tracked by the headset's cameras.

=== Audio ===
The Quest has embedded speakers, as well as a pair of 3.5 mm audio jacks on each side for use with external headphones.

== Accessories ==
Though the Oculus Quest has built-in audio, it was possible to purchase official in-ear headphones from Facebook. There is also an official travel case.

Following the release of the Oculus Link feature, Facebook released an official 5 m (16 ft)-long USB-C cable designed for use with the feature. The cable is fiber optic, as the reliability of non-powered USB cables with copper-based wires diminishes at 10 feet (3.0 m).

== Software ==
Facebook enforces stricter content and quality standards for software distributed on Oculus Quest in comparison to Oculus Go and Gear VR, including requiring developers to undergo a pre-screening of their concepts to demonstrate "quality and probable market success". In 2021, Facebook introduced "App Lab", a new section within the storefront allowing developers to upload and distribute Quest apps without going through the formal review process. App Lab is designed primarily to support early access models, and can support public and invite-based distribution.

Facebook launched the headset with over 50 titles consisting of a mix of new and ported games, including titles such as Beat Saber, Moss, Robo Recall, Superhot VR, and VRChat. Some games support cross-play with their PC versions.

At Oculus Connect 6 in September 2019, it was announced that backward compatibility with over 50 Oculus Go applications and games would be added to the Quest. In addition, users who had purchased Oculus Go apps would be eligible to download Oculus Quest-specific versions of them for free through the end of 2019.

=== Oculus Link ===
At Oculus Connect 6, Facebook announced Oculus Link, a function which allows the Quest to be used with Oculus Rift-compatible software on a PC over USB. It became available in beta on November 12, 2019, as part of system software version 11. Initially, Link only supported USB 3.0 connections. In May 2020, support for USB 2.0 was added, although Facebook still recommends use of USB 3.0 cables.

On June 13, 2021, Zuckerberg stated that Oculus Air Link, a feature from the Quest 2 that allows Link to be used over a local Wi-Fi connection, would also be made available for the original Quest.

== Reception ==
Scott Stein of CNET considered the Quest to be "improbably amazing for its size and $399 price tag", and compared it to Nintendo Switch in terms of convenience. Stein praised its camera system and motion controls, and its graphics quality for being nearer to PC-quality than Oculus Go (albeit still limited in detail due to its use of mobile computing hardware). The Quest was panned for being a closed platform at launch — with software limited to the Oculus Store, and not being backwards compatible with software released for Oculus Go. Adi Robertson of The Verge shared similar opinions, noting that the Quest was heavier and not as comfortable as Rift S, and that its launch titles were not at the same caliber as the PC Oculus Rift in terms of size or graphical fidelity, but that the Quest still included a physical IPD slider unlike the Rift S.

In May 2020, The Verge acknowledged that the Quest had improved since its launch to become "the closest thing that exists to a sleek, almost mainstream VR headset", citing an expanding software library, and the ability to use the headset with a PC over USB via the Oculus Link feature (and over Wi-Fi using the sideloaded third-party software Virtual Desktop, which was not "noticeably worse" than doing so over USB in their experience). It was argued that the Quest "works so well by itself that it's a great system in its own right", while Oculus Link allowed it to double as a "credible" PC VR headset as well. While it was noted that the Rift S was less front-heavy and that its display "trades contrast for slightly higher resolution and refresh rate", it was argued that neither it or the Valve Index "works as a perfectly good standalone wireless VR headset". VentureBeat felt that Oculus was "setting the stage" for discontinuing the Rift line in favor of Quest, arguing "if Link performs as expected, most users will have little to no idea of what they're missing — Rift S' extra camera, FPS, and resolution differences won't matter much."

=== Sales ===
Two weeks after launch, Oculus announced that it had sold $5 million worth of content for the Oculus Quest. At Oculus Connect 6, it was announced that the Quest had created over 20% of the generated revenue from all platforms at Oculus, totaling at $20 million. It was also reported during the same event that the Quest has by far the highest retention rate of all their headsets. 317,000 units were sold over the 4th quarter of 2019, and was sold out at times.
