= Zero-click result =

Answer to database query

A Google query for Thomas Jefferson provides zero-click search access to Wikipedia directly on the search engine results page.

A zero-click result is the successful resolution of a web query when the user gets their desired result immediately on the search engine results page without having to navigate to any followup source of information.

== History ==
=== Early Web model ===
The World Wide Web became public in 1993, and by 1995 there was an ecosystem of websites. Soon thereafter, the most popular way to arrive at a website was user input of keywords into a search engine. Search engines such as Yahoo Search, Google Search, or DuckDuckGo provide a list of websites and the user selects the desired one by clicking its hyperlink, and in the process is tracked with a click-through rate.

In the late 2000s, major search platforms began to change their search engine results page to include content collected from sources including web scraping of the websites which appeared in their web indexing. The consequence was declining traffic to websites, as users found their needs sufficiently met by remaining in the search platform without traveling onward to other websites.

=== More than search results ===
In 2007, Google introduced Universal Search, incorporating results from various Google services including YouTube and Google Maps. In 2009, Google introduced rich snippets, which used structured data from websites to provide snippets from the underlying page, such as restaurant reviews and social media profile overviews. In 2012, Google began displaying a Knowledge Panel, which presents information about individuals, organizations, locations, or objects directly within the search interface using data from the Google Knowledge Graph. Microsoft Bing also released a similar "knowledge and action graph" (also called Satori).

==== AI responses ====
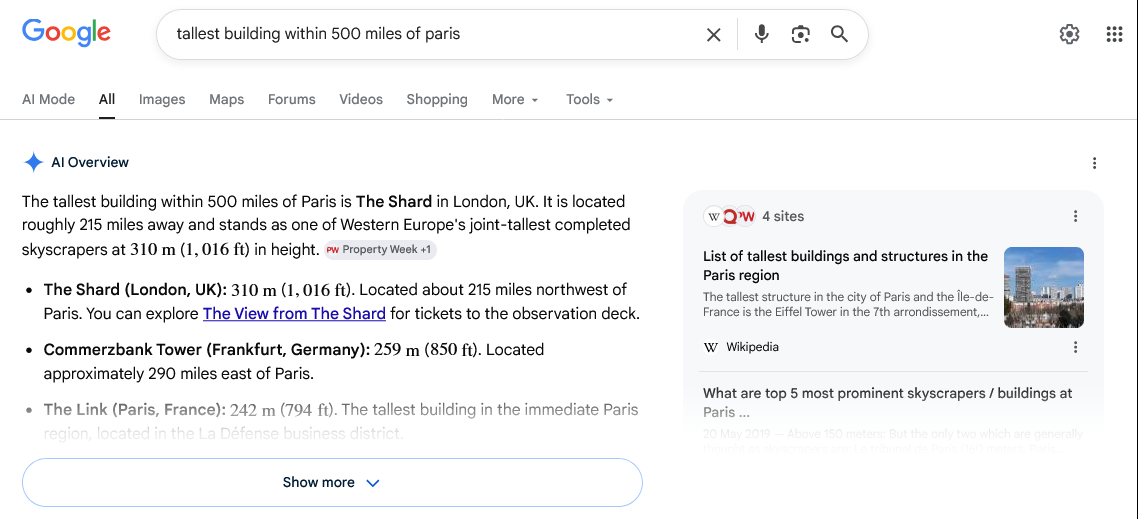
AI Overviews result in Google Search for "tallest building within 500 miles of paris", generated on June 2, 2026

In 2024, search engines began incorporating AI-generated summaries into search result pages. Google announced Search Generative Experience at a 2023 developer event; in 2024, the feature was renamed AI Overviews and released. Also in 2024, Microsoft released Bing generative search, which functions similarly. In 2025, Google introduced AI Mode, incorporating an AI-powered chatbot tab into the search interface.

== Trends ==
As of 2025, about 60% of search engine users in the United States do not click through to leave the search platform and travel to the open web after their search. Many users who remain in the search platform use AI-generated results. Additionally, AI-generated advertising is several times more effective in conversion marketing than non-AI advertising.

== Marketing ==
Conventional pageview tracking does not detect zero-click results, and consequently, conventional digital marketing strategies which rely on pageview analysis do not apply. This occurs because zero-click results are resolved entirely within the search engine results page, generating no HTTP request to the publisher's server and therefore leaving no record in standard web analytics systems. There are adaptive marketing strategies which can take into account zero-click results. As zero-click behavior has become more prevalent, a related practice known as generative engine optimization (GEO) has emerged, through which publishers and marketers optimize content specifically for inclusion in AI-generated search results rather than traditional ranked listings.

== Google Zero ==
Zero-click results have raised concerns among online publishers, because dwindling website traffic from users whose queries are satisfied without ever visiting the source page can lead to decreased revenue for advertising-supported publications. Nilay Patel, editor-in-chief of The Verge, coined the phrase Google Zero to refer to a point in time when Google stops providing any click traffic whatsoever.

Some publishers, such as The Verge and Wired, have cited Google Zero when announcing strategies to focus more on direct relationships with readers through email newsletters and interactive offerings. Wired's Katie Drummond described the phenomenon as a "traffic apocalypse".

== See also ==
- Generative engine optimization
- Web analytics
