= Nilay Patel =

American editor and journalist

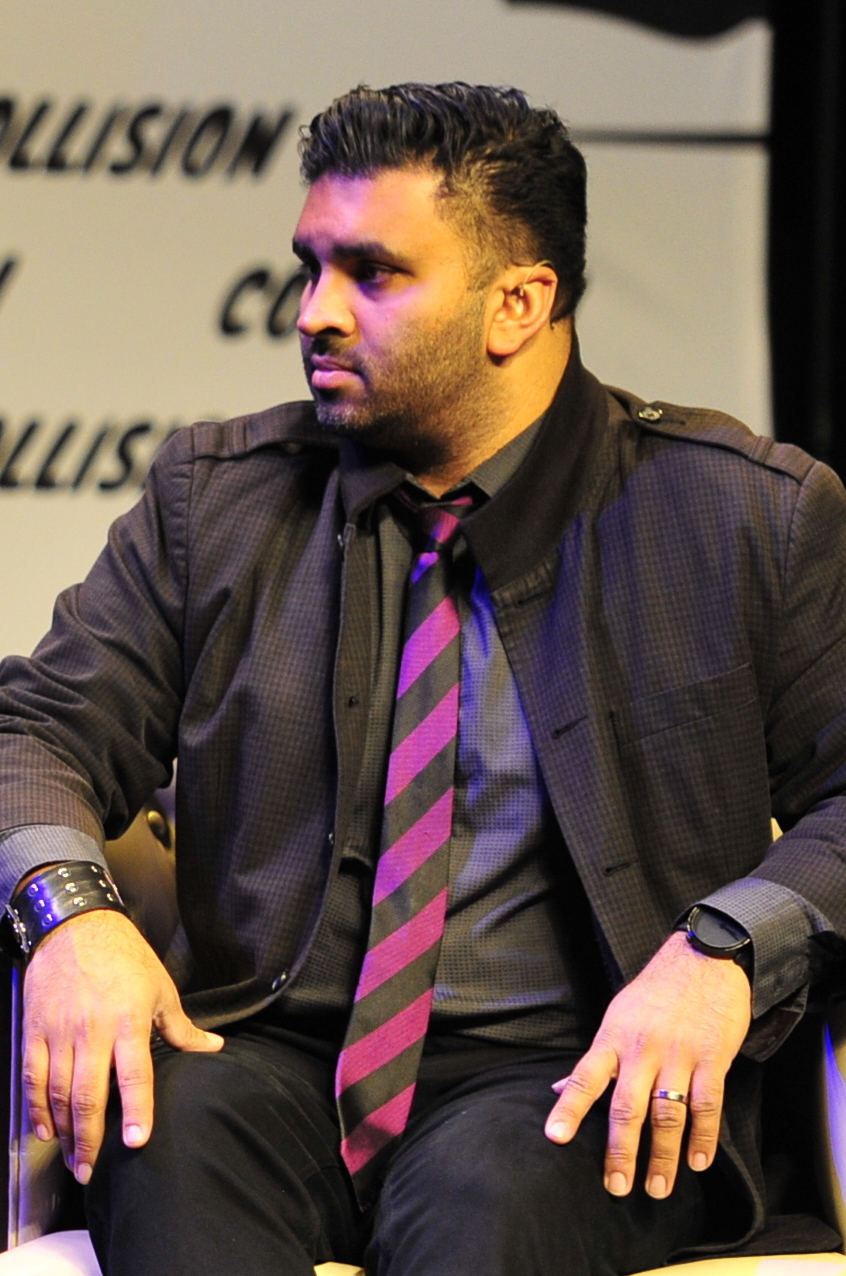
- Patel at Collision Conference 2016 in New Orleans, Louisiana
- Education: University of Chicago (AB); University of Wisconsin–Madison (JD)
- Occupations: Editor-in-chief, The Verge
- Known for: Engadget, This Is My Next, The Verge

Nilay Patel (/ˈniːlaɪ/) is an American journalist, editor, and former blogger who is editor-in-chief of technology news website The Verge.

== Education ==
In 2003, Patel earned a Bachelor of Arts degree in political science from the University of Chicago. In 2006, he received his Juris Doctor from the University of Wisconsin Law School.

== Career ==
Patel had his first blogging job at Gapers Block, a Chicago-centric blog. He joined Engadget in 2008 and was responsible for blogging. In 2011 Patel left Engadget along with a few co-workers to start The Verge. In March 2014 he left The Verge to join sister site Vox. In July 2014 he returned to The Verge as editor-in-chief, after Joshua Topolsky left the position to work at Bloomberg.

Patel is a co-host of The Vergecast, which has won the Webby Award for best technology podcast. He also hosts Decoder, a podcast on which he interviews tech and policy leaders, launched in 2020. He makes regular appearances on The Verge's "history show meets a rewatch podcast" show, Version History.

Patel has appeared on a number of news channels, including MS NOW (formerly MSNBC), Fox News, CNN, CNN International, NPR, Sky News, NHK, G4TV, and TWiT.

Patel coined the term "Google Zero" to criticize the direction of search engines like Google Search integrating LLM tools like AI Overviews, which scrape media outlets for content and reduce click-through web traffic.
