= Instant answer =

Information shown in search engines, including AI-generated responses

A Google search for Nelson Mandela. The traditional instant answer can be seen on the right.

An instant answer is a type of response supplied by a search engine in response to a search query, without the user having to navigate away from the search results page.

Originally restricted to basic calculations, weather updates, or static definitions, instant answers have evolved with advancements in Artificial Intelligence into real-time generative summaries that synthesize text from multiple web sources simultaneously.

== Evolution and Layout ==
The layout and function of instant answers changed significantly with the integration of semantic databases and large language models. In 2012, Google introduced the Knowledge Graph, mapping relationships between entities to present direct factual data in dedicated panels next to search results. By 2014, search engines widely implemented featured snippets to pull verbatim text excerpts from high-ranking web pages to immediately answer descriptive queries.

In early 2023, the landscape shifted with the introduction of "The New Bing," which utilized large language models to provide conversational, synthesized responses rather than static single-source snippets. In 2024, Google transitioned its experimental Search Generative Experience into "AI Overviews," placing multi-source AI summaries at the top of standard search result pages. By 2025, these overviews expanded to over 200 countries and territories.

Google subsequently rolled out "AI Mode," an interactive interface allowing multi-turn, iterative research where the entire search experience is dynamically generated and adapted by AI. This system relies on a technical process called query fan-out to break down multifaceted prompts into parallel internal sub-searches.

The relative placement of these answers depends on the format:

- Knowledge Panels: Factual profiles, maps, and structured entity details generally appear to the right of the search results on desktop layouts.
- Inline Blocks: Featured snippets, AI-generated overviews, and DuckDuckGo instant answers sit directly below the search bar and above organic text links to provide immediate visibility.

== Optimization Fields ==
The transition toward direct answer retrieval has fundamentally altered online content visibility, prompting digital publishers and marketers to move beyond traditional search engine optimization (SEO) into specialized frameworks:

- Answer Engine Optimization (AEO): The practice of optimizing content structure explicitly for voice assistants, featured snippets, and immediate question-and-answer databases.
- Generative engine optimization (GEO): A specialized framework formalized in peer-reviewed research at the ACM SIGKDD 2024 conference by researchers from Princeton University, Georgia Tech, the Allen Institute for AI, and IIT Delhi. GEO involves a set of specific text adjustments, such as increasing semantic density, ensuring multi-source corroboration, maintaining factual alignment, and structuring data to ensure content is accurately cited by large language models. Unlike classic SEO which targets keyword density and backlink volume, GEO focuses on authoritativeness, expert consensus, and direct answers to targeted sub-queries. The foundational Princeton study demonstrated that targeted GEO methods, including the addition of expert quotations and authoritative citations, can boost content visibility in AI answers by up to 40%.

== Legal and Industry Friction ==
The prominence of generative answers has caused severe traffic drops for independent web publishers, sparking widespread industry debate, antitrust scrutiny, and copyright litigation. An academic field experiment conducted by researchers Saharsh Agarwal and Ananya Sen demonstrated a 39.8% decrease in outbound organic clicks when AI summaries are displayed. The study revealed that these traffic losses are heavily concentrated in informational queries, directly refuting industry claims that AI summaries only eliminate low-engagement website visits.

Consequently, multiple high-profile legal challenges emerged regarding the unauthorized reproduction of proprietary data:

- Chegg v. Google (2025): An antitrust lawsuit filed by the education technology company in the United States District Court for the District of Columbia. Chegg argued that Google unfairly leveraged its market dominance to trap users within its own ecosystem by summarizing answers directly. The complaint alleged that Google drew on Chegg's proprietary collection of 135 million questions and answers to generate responses, acting as an anti-competitive answer engine rather than a neutral directory in violation of the Sherman Antitrust Act.
- Penske Media Corporation v. Google (2025): An antitrust lawsuit filed by the media conglomerate, the publisher of Rolling Stone, Variety, and The Hollywood Reporter, in federal district court. The corporation alleged that Google systematically scraped and duplicated its copyrighted entertainment reporting inside AI Overviews and Gemini without consent. The lawsuit contended that this practice directly deprived publishers of digital advertising and affiliate revenue by keeping users locked within Google's search environment.
- European Regulatory Enforcements: Investigations by the European Commission and national competition authorities focused on potential abuses of market dominance under the Digital Markets Act (DMA) and the infringement of publishers' neighboring rights under the DSM Copyright Directive. Regulatory bodies are evaluating whether generative summaries act as direct publisher substitutes rather than traditional indexing services, prompting global legal demands for a fair licensing and remuneration framework.

== DuckDuckGo instant answers ==
Unlike search systems that generate custom narrative prose using internal AI engines, DuckDuckGo relies on a hybrid framework drawing from external data sources to surface instant widgets, tools, and summaries. Historically, the company operated an open-source community platform called "DuckDuckHack" which allowed external users to create and maintain custom instant answers for specific programming tools, flight trackers, and calculations.
