= Knowledge Graph (Google) =

Knowledge base to enhance search results

Knowledge panel data about Thomas Jefferson displayed on Google Search, as of January 2015

The Knowledge Graph is a knowledge base from which Google serves relevant information in an infobox beside its search results. This allows the user to see the answer in a glance, as an instant answer. The data is generated automatically from a variety of sources, covering places, people, businesses, and more.

The information covered by Google's Knowledge Graph grew quickly after its launch in May 2012, tripling its data size within seven months (covering 570 million entities and 18 billion facts). By mid-2016, Google reported that it held 70 billion facts and answered "roughly one-third" of the 100 billion monthly searches they handled. By May 2020, this had grown to 500 billion facts on 5 billion entities.

There is no official documentation of how the Google Knowledge Graph is implemented. According to Google, its information is retrieved from many sources, including Wikipedia. It is used to answer direct spoken questions in Google Assistant and Google Home voice queries. It has been criticized for providing answers with neither source attribution nor citations.

== History ==
Google announced its Knowledge Graph on May 16, 2012, as a way to significantly enhance the value of information returned by Google searches. Initially available only in English, it was expanded in December 2012 to Spanish, French, German, Portuguese, Japanese, Russian and Italian. Bengali support was added in March 2017.

The Knowledge Graph was powered in part by Freebase.

In August 2014, New Scientist reported that Google had launched a Knowledge Vault project. After publication, Google reached out to Search Engine Land to explain that Knowledge Vault was a research report, not an active Google service. Search Engine Land expressed indications that Google was experimenting with "numerous models" for gathering meaning from text.

Google's Knowledge Vault was meant to deal with facts, automatically gathering and merging information from across the Internet into a knowledge base capable of answering direct questions, such as "Where was Madonna born?" In a 2014 report, the Vault was reported to have collected over 1.6 billion facts, 271 million of which were considered "confident facts" deemed to be more than 90% true. It was reported to be different from the Knowledge Graph in that it gathered information automatically instead of relying on crowd-sourced facts compiled by humans.

== Features ==
=== Google Knowledge Panel ===
A Google Knowledge Panel which is part of Google search engine result pages, presents an overview of entities such as individuals, organizations, locations, or objects directly within the search interface. This feature uses data from Google Knowledge Graph, an extensive database that organizes and interconnects information about entities, enhancing the retrieval and presentation of relevant content to users.

Panels are generated automatically rather than written by Google staff. Google has said that panel content comes from a variety of sources across the web, and that panel images are either chosen by verified users or sourced automatically from websites. According to the company, many errors are corrected automatically when the underlying web content changes and its systems refresh their data. A 2019 Google white paper on combating disinformation presented knowledge panels as a way of giving users context while searching.

=== Carousel ===
For searches that ask for a list Google can show Knowledge Graph results as a carousel that users scroll through. The carousel first appeared for English-language users of google.com and was extended to English-language users of all Google domains in September 2012.

=== Google Trends ===
In December 2013, Google Trends began using the Knowledge Graph to track topics as well as exact search terms. This lets users separate topics that share a name, such as Rice University and rice.

== Criticism ==
=== Lack of source attribution ===
By May 2016, knowledge boxes were appearing for "roughly one-third" of the 100 billion monthly searches the company processed. Dario Taraborelli, head of research at the Wikimedia Foundation, told The Washington Post that Google's omission of sources in its knowledge boxes "undermines people’s ability to verify information and, ultimately, to develop well-informed opinions". The publication also reported that the boxes are "frequently unattributed", such as a knowledge box on the age of actress Betty White, which is "as unsourced and absolute as if handed down by God".

=== Declining Wikipedia article readership ===
According to The Register in 2014, the display of direct answers in knowledge panels alongside Google search results caused significant readership declines for Wikipedia, from which the panels obtained some of their information. Also in 2014, The Daily Dot noted that "Wikipedia still has no real competitor as far as actual content is concerned. All that's up for grabs are traffic stats. And as a nonprofit, traffic numbers don't equate into revenue in the same way they do for a commercial media site". After the article's publication, a spokesperson for the Wikimedia Foundation, which operates Wikipedia, stated that it "welcomes" the knowledge panel functionality, that it was "looking into" the traffic drops, and that "We've also not noticed a significant drop in search engine referrals. We also have a continuing dialog with staff from Google working on the Knowledge Panel".

In his 2020 book, Dariusz Jemielniak noted that as most Google users do not realize that many answers to their questions that appear in the Knowledge Graph come from Wikipedia, this reduces Wikipedia's popularity, and in turn limited the site's ability to raise new funds and attract new volunteers.

=== Bias ===
The algorithm has been criticized for presenting biased or inaccurate information, usually because of sourcing information from websites with high search engine optimization. It had been noted in 2014 that while there was a Knowledge Graph for most major historical or pseudo-historical religious figures such as Moses, Muhammad and Gautama Buddha, there was none for Jesus, the central figure of Christianity. On June 3, 2021, a knowledge box identified Kannada as the ugliest language in India, prompting outrage from the Kannada-language community; the state of Karnataka, where most Kannada speakers live, also threatened to sue Google for damaging the public image of the language. Google promptly changed the featured snippet for the search query and issued a formal apology.

== See also ==
- DBpedia
- Google Assistant
- Linked data
- Knowledge graph
- Semantic integration
- Semantic network
- Wikidata
- AI Overviews
