= Halalgoogling =

Islamic search engine blocking haram content

- Website type: Web search engine
- Available in: 5 languages
- Revenue: From AdWords
- Website: halalgoogling.com (US)
- Commercial: Yes
- Registration: Optional
- Launched: 9 July 2013; 13 years ago
- Current status: Defunct
- Written in: Python, C, C++

Halalgoogling was an Islamic internet search engine, launched on 9 July 2013. Halalgoogling could be used to block content that is deemed haram by Sharia law. It collected results from other web search engines such as Google and Bing and presented only the halal results to its users. As of February 2025, the website appears to be defunct.
