= Google Browser Sync =

Former Firefox extension by Google

- Developer(s): Google
- Final release: 1.3.20070523 / May 25, 2007
- Platform: Firefox 1 and 2
- Type: Synchronization
- License: New BSD License
- Website: www.google.com/tools/firefox/browsersync/

Google Browser Sync was a Mozilla Firefox extension released as freeware from Google. It debuted in Google Labs on June 8, 2006, and in June 2008, was discontinued. It allowed users of Mozilla Firefox up to versions 2.x to synchronize their web browser settings across multiple computers via the Internet.

Google Browser Sync required a Google account, in which the user's cookies, saved passwords, bookmarks, browsing history, tabs, and open windows could be stored. The data was optionally encrypted using an alphanumerical PIN, which theoretically prevented even Google from reading the data. Passwords and cookies were always encrypted and could only be accessed by the user.

Google Browser Sync technology was integrated into Google Chrome.

== See also ==
- Firefox Sync
