= DuckDuckGo =

Privacy-focused online software company

- Logo used since 2023

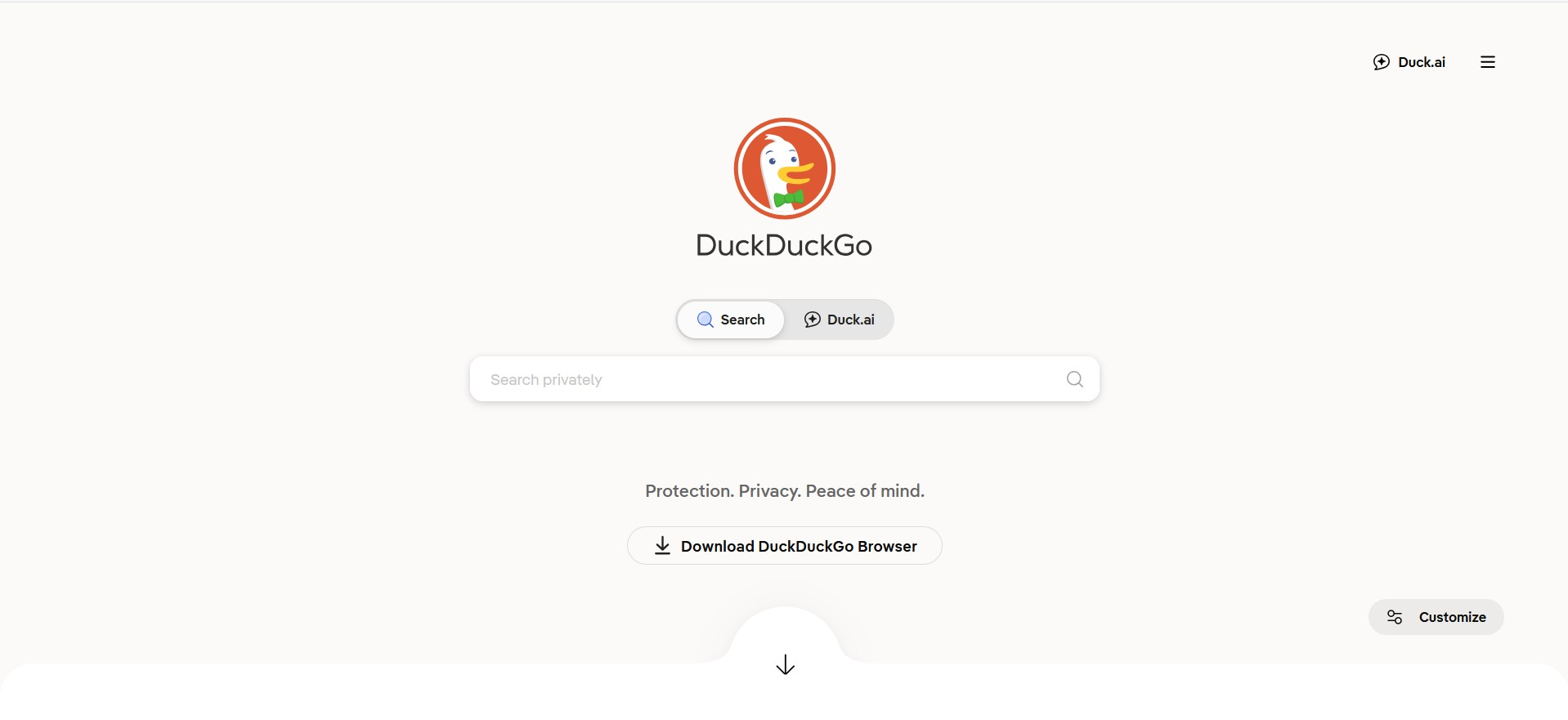
- Screenshot Screenshot of the DuckDuckGo homepage as of 2026
- Website type: Search engine
- Available in: Multilingual
- Headquarters: 20 Paoli Pike, Paoli, Pennsylvania, United States
- Area served: Worldwide, except for North Korea, Indonesia and China
- Owners: Duck Duck Go, Inc.
- Founder: Gabriel Weinberg
- CEO: Gabriel Weinberg
- Key people: Steve Fischer (CBO)
- Website: duckduckgo.com
- Commercial: Yes
- Registration: Optional to use @duck.com email address and DuckDuckGo subscription
- Launched: September 25, 2008; 18 years ago
- Current status: Active
- Written in: Perl, JavaScript, Python

DuckDuckGo is an American software company founded by Gabriel Weinberg in 2008 that focuses on Internet privacy. It is known for focusing on user privacy and limiting the amount of personal information collected during online searches. Its flagship product is a search engine named DuckDuckGo. Its later products include browser extensions and a custom DuckDuckGo web browser. Headquartered in Paoli, Pennsylvania, DuckDuckGo is a privately held company with about 335 employees. The company's name alludes to the children's game duck, duck, goose.

== History ==
=== Early years ===
Weinberg got the idea to improve the search experience in a 2007 stained glass class. He tried some search startups that failed before launching DuckDuckGo in 2008.

Weinberg is an entrepreneur who previously launched Names Database, a now defunct social network. Self-funded by Weinberg until October 2011, DuckDuckGo's series A round was led by Union Square Ventures. DuckDuckGo is built primarily upon search APIs from various vendors. As a result, TechCrunch called the service a "hybrid" search engine.

In 2010, DuckDuckGo began using privacy to differentiate itself from its competitors. Linux Mint and the Midori web browser had switched to DuckDuckGo as their default search engine by 2011.

The company registered the domain name ddg.gg on February 22, 2011. DuckDuckGo acquired the duck.com domain name from Google in December 2018. Google had previously obtained the domain in 2010 through its acquisition of On2, a video codec company. The two domain names have been redirected to the primary domain name duckduckgo.com, while the duck.com domain name is also used as the domain for their email protection service.

=== Growth in the 2010s ===
We didn't invest in it because we thought it would beat Google. We invested in it because there is a need for a private search engine. We did it for the Internet anarchists, people that hang out on Reddit and Hacker News.

— Fred Wilson, 2012 TechCrunch Disrupt Conference in New York

Logo used from 2014 to 2026

Weinberg reported that it had earned $115,000 in revenue in 2011 and had three employees, plus a small number of contractors. In a November 2012, profile, The Washington Post concluded:

Weinberg's non-ambitious goals make him a particularly odd and dangerous competitor online. He can do almost everything that Google or Bing can't because it could damage their business models, and if users figure out that they like the DuckDuckGo way better, Weinberg could damage the big boys without even really trying. It's asymmetrical digital warfare, and his backers at Union Square Ventures say Google is vulnerable.

The Edward Snowden leaks in 2013 resulted in a lot more awareness about surveillance and growth in users of DuckDuckGo. Growth in privacy concerns also boosted users in 2018 after the Cambridge Analytica scandal.

At its keynote speech at WWDC 2014 on June 2, 2014, Apple announced that DuckDuckGo would be included as a search option in both iOS 8 and OS X Yosemite in its Safari browser. On March 10, the Pale Moon web browser, starting with version 24.4.0, included DuckDuckGo as its default search engine, as well as listed it on the browser's homepage. On May 21, 2014, DuckDuckGo officially released the redesigned version that focused on smarter answers and a more refined look. The new version added many new features, such as images, local search, auto-suggest, weather, and recipes.

On November 10, 2014, Mozilla added DuckDuckGo as a search option to Firefox 33.1. On May 30, 2016, The Tor Project, Inc made DuckDuckGo the default search engine for Tor Browser 6.0.

In July 2016, DuckDuckGo officially announced the extension of its partnership with Yahoo! that brought new features to all users of the search engine, including date filtering of results and additional site links. It also had partnerships with Bing, Yandex, and Wikipedia to produce results or to use their features. The company also confirmed that it does not share user information with partner companies, as has always been its policy.

In December 2018, it was reported that Google had transferred ownership of the domain name duck.com to DuckDuckGo after owning the domain for several years when it acquired On2 Technologies (previously known as The Duck Corporation). It is not known what price, if any, DuckDuckGo paid for the domain name. Weinberg said, "We're pleased Google has chosen to transfer ownership of Duck.com to DuckDuckGo. Having Duck.com will make it easier for people to use DuckDuckGo."

In 2018 and 2019, DuckDuckGo held ultimately unsuccessful talks with Apple about becoming the default search option on Safari's private browsing mode, though it had successfully integrated other privacy features into Safari. On January 15, 2019, DuckDuckGo announced that all map and address-related searches would be powered by Apple Maps, both on desktop and mobile devices.

In March 2019, Google added DuckDuckGo to the default search engine list in Chrome.

The company has offered browser extensions for popular web browsers (including Google Chrome and Firefox). The company also launched its own web browser, called the DuckDuckGo Private Browser, which became available on Desktop in 2022. Both of these products offer some protections against web tracking and other privacy intrusions for all web browsing (not limited to DuckDuckGo searches). Before August 2022, DuckDuckGo Private Browser did not block Microsoft tracking scripts.

=== 2020s ===
In July 2021, DuckDuckGo introduced its email forwarding feature, Email Protection, which lets users claim an "@duck.com" email address generated by the service. That inbox will receive emails, strip them of data trackers, and forward them to the user's private email address. The feature launched in beta for mobile users of DuckDuckGo Private Browser and released to all customers in August 2022.

Also in April 2022, DuckDuckGo said that they would protect users from being tracked by Google's Accelerated Mobile Pages framework, stating: "When you load or share a Google AMP page anywhere from DuckDuckGo apps (iOS/Android/MacOS) or extensions (Firefox/Chrome), the original publisher's webpage will be used in place of the Google AMP version".

In September 2022, Debian package maintainers switched the default search engine in Chromium to DuckDuckGo for privacy reasons.

In April 2024, DuckDuckGo introduced its own paid subscription, the DuckDuckGo Subscription (formerly Privacy Pro) with Pro and Plus tiers. It includes a VPN, access to more advanced AI models, personal information removal, and identity theft restoration. The subscription launched to users of the DuckDuckGo browser in the United States.

Starting in 2025, DuckDuckGo rolled out a series of Easter eggs featuring variants of the DuckDuckGo logo with Dax (DuckDuckGo's mascot) dressed as characters from popular culture when users search for the respective characters. There are over 800 discovered pop culture logos as of July 2026. Weinberg claimed that designing these images "involve[s] AI, but it is still a fairly manual process, and [DuckDuckGo's] design team (and others) have been involved in it."

By August 2025, Bing had planned to cut off access to its search APIs in a push to sell more AI-related APIs, though DuckDuckGo believed that larger companies like it with long-term deals would not be affected. Bing had dramatically raised rates for its search API in 2022 after ChatGPT debuted.

In 2026, DuckDuckGo introduced "Collaborations", partnerships with companies such as Atoms, Yubico, and Cotton Bureau to create limited-edition "dark mode"-themed merchandise.

== Features ==
=== Privacy ===
DuckDuckGo does not store IP addresses or user information that are used for micro-targeting or sold to advertisers on other search engines.

=== Search results ===
DuckDuckGo's results have used a compilation of "over 400" sources according to itself, including Bing, Yahoo! Search BOSS, Wolfram Alpha, Yandex, and its own web crawler (the DuckDuckBot). It also uses data from crowdsourced sites such as Wikipedia, to populate knowledge panel boxes to the right of the search results. During a Bing API outage in 2024, DuckDuckGo stopped showing results, indicating that Bing provided a substantial portion of DuckDuckGo's results.

DuckDuckGo offers HTML and lite versions of its search for browsers without JavaScript capabilities.

DuckDuckGo has refined the quality of its search engine results by deleting search results for companies they believe are content mills, such as eHow, which publishes 4,000 articles per day produced by paid freelance writers, which Weinberg states to be "low-quality content designed specifically to rank highly in Google's search index". DuckDuckGo also filters pages with substantial advertising. DuckDuckGo uses assessments by other organizations to down rank websites deemed to have low journalistic standards.

=== Instant Answers ===
In addition to the indexed search results, DuckDuckGo displays relevant results, called instant answers, at the top of the search page. These Instant Answers are collected from third-party APIs or static data sources such as text files. The Instant Answers are called zeroclickinfo because the intention behind these is to provide what users are searching for on the search result page itself, so that they do not have to click any results to find what they are looking for. Instant answers are created by and maintained by a community of open source contributors. This community came to be known as DuckDuckHack, which was launched in 2012 as a way for users to code and crowdsource their own plugins. As of August 31, 2017, DuckDuckHack was placed in "maintenance mode"; as such, only pull requests for bug fixes will be approved.

In March 2023, DuckDuckGo added Search Assist (formerly known as DuckAssist) to Instant Answers. Using large language models from OpenAI and Anthropic, Search Assist generates answers to users' questions by sourcing reputable online encyclopedias (like Wikipedia or Encyclopedia Britannica) using its own web crawler, the DuckAssistBot, separate from DuckDuckGo's main web crawler, the DuckDuckBot. Users can choose how often they want it to appear: Never, On-demand (only when Assist is clicked), Sometimes (when highly relevant), or Often (on a wide range of searches). Search Assist results also contain a "More" button, which allows users to have the AI generate a longer answer, and a button which allows users to ask a follow-up question using DuckDuckGo's AI chatbot, Duck.ai.

=== Tor access ===
In August 2010, DuckDuckGo introduced anonymous searching, including an exit enclave, for its search engine traffic using Tor network and enabling access through a "Tor hidden service" (onion service). 3g2upl4pq6kufc4m.onion ^{(Accessing link help)} (deprecated) was the DuckDuckGo v2 onion service on Tor. This allows anonymity by routing traffic through a series of encrypted relays. Weinberg said, "I believe this fits right in line with our privacy policy. Using Tor and DDG, you can now be end-to-end anonymous with your searches. And if you use our encrypted homepage, you can be end-to-end encrypted as well."

In July 2021, DuckDuckGo introduced a new v3 onion service, with a new link: duckduckgogg42xjoc72x3sjasowoarfbgcmvfimaftt6twagswzczad.onion ^{(Accessing link help)}.

=== Bangs ===
DuckDuckGo includes "!Bang" keywords, which let users search specific third-party websites using the site's own search engine, if applicable. As of May 2026, 13,566 "bangs" for a diverse range of internet sites are available. In December 2018, around 2,000 "bangs" were deleted. Some were deleted because they were broken, while others, such as searches for pirated content sites, were deleted for liability reasons.

=== Duck.ai ===
Duck.ai (known as DuckDuckGo AI Chat during beta) is an opt-in chatbot that enables users to interact anonymously and privately with multiple large language models (LLMs). The service functions as an extension to Search Assist, and is also slightly similar to Google's own AI service, Gemini. Introduced as a freemium service in June 2024 and exiting beta in March 2025, Duck.ai provides free access to models by companies like OpenAI, Anthropic and Mistral AI, while users with the DuckDuckGo subscription can receive higher usage limits and access to more advanced model versions. DuckDuckGo says that conversations within Duck.ai are stored locally on the user's device, and that prompts and outputs are not retained for model training because all data sent to providers is anonymized. No metadata about the user or their device is shared with AI companies. Users can disable Duck.ai and/or Search Assist. Computeractive said Duck.ai was their preferred privacy-focused AI.

Duck.ai Image Gen is a feature that allows users to create AI-generated images by entering descriptive prompts. Generated images are stored locally on users' devices, with C2PA-compliant metadata for verification. The feature exited beta in January 2026. The optional ability to add reference images was also added around that time.

Voice chat was also added to Duck.ai in January 2026.

==== AI poll ====
From January 16–26, 2026, DuckDuckGo ran a poll asking whether or not users approved of the AI features available on the site, due to criticism of AI. 90% of people voted "No AI", while 10% voted "Yes AI". No changes were made to DuckDuckGo as a result of the poll's final results, but two new DuckDuckGo websites were created, one with AI, and the other without AI.

== DuckDuckGo Private Browser ==
DuckDuckGo Private Browser
- Engines: Blink (Android, Windows); WebKit (iOS, macOS)
- Operating system: Android, iOS, macOS, Windows
- License: Freeware (the underlying WebView components provided by the operating systems) though DuckDuckGo's custom code for Android and iOS is shared with an Apache-2.0 license
- Website: duckduckgo.com/app
- Repository: github.com/duckduckgo/duckduckgo

DuckDuckGo Private Browser are web browsers created by DuckDuckGo. They are privacy-oriented browsers available for Android, iOS, macOS, and Windows.

The core browser functionality is the WebView component provided by the operating system. This means the browser engine is Blink on Android and Windows, and WebKit on iOS and macOS.

=== Features ===
- The browsers do not support extensions for Windows, Mac, iOS, or Android.
- Automatically blocks web trackers, and upgrades insecure HTTP connections to HTTPS when possible.
- Has a special "Duck Player" that allows users to watch YouTube videos without being targeted with advertisements and tracking cookies.
- Has an automatic cookie consent tool and supports the Global Privacy Control option.
- The Android version has a feature called App Tracking Protection which, when enabled, blocks trackers in other Android applications.

DuckDuckGo VPN uses the WireGuard protocol.

=== History ===
DuckDuckGo Private Browser was first released for Android and iOS in 2018. Desktop support began in 2022, with the beta version for macOS. The beta version for Windows was released in 2023.

== Business model ==
DuckDuckGo earns revenue by serving ads primarily from the Yahoo-Bing search alliance network. As a privacy-focused search engine, the ads served on DuckDuckGo are based on keywords and terms of the search query. As of April 2024, DuckDuckGo also makes money from subscription fees.

=== Donations ===
The company supports charitable organizations that work to improve privacy; including in 2021 $200,000 to the Center for Information Technology Policy, $150,000 to the Electronic Frontier Foundation, $75,000 to European Digital Rights (EDRi) and $75,000 to The Markup.

== Reception ==
In a June 2011 article, Harry McCracken of Time commended DuckDuckGo, comparing it to his favorite hamburger restaurant, In-N-Out Burger:

It feels a lot like early Google, with a stripped-down home page. Just as In-N-Out doesn't have lattes or Asian salads or sundaes or scrambled eggs, DDG doesn't try to do news or blogs or books or images. There's no auto-completion or instant results. It just offers core Web search—mostly the "ten blue links" approach that's still really useful, no matter what its critics say ... As for the quality, I'm not saying that Weinberg has figured out a way to return more relevant results than Google's mighty search team. But DuckDuckGo ... is really good at bringing back useful sites. It all feels meaty and straightforward and filler-free ...

The bare-bones approach cited in his quote has since changed; for instance, in 2014 DuckDuckGo added auto-completion, images, weather and more. McCracken included the site in Time's list of "50 Best Websites of 2011."

Thom Holwerda, who reviewed the search engine for OSNews, praised its privacy features and shortcuts to site-specific searches as well as criticizing Google for "tracking pretty much everything you do", particularly because of the risk of such information being subject to a U.S. government subpoena. In 2012, in response to accusations that it was a monopoly, Google identified DuckDuckGo as a competitor. Weinberg was reportedly "pleased and entertained" by that acknowledgment.

In November 2019, then-Twitter CEO Jack Dorsey revealed his preference for using the DuckDuckGo search engine rather than Google, tweeting, "I love @DuckDuckGo. My default search engine for a while now. The app is even better!". Conservative political commentators Ben Shapiro and Dan Bongino have also endorsed DuckDuckGo.

== Notable events ==
=== Pausing Yandex partnership ===
On March 1, 2022, in response to the Russian invasion of Ukraine, DuckDuckGo paused its partnership with Yandex Search. Weinberg said in a tweet that DuckDuckGo will down-rank sites associated with Russian disinformation, a move which some users criticized as censorship and a violation of the search engine's commitment to "unbiased search." DuckDuckGo has defended itself from the criticism, saying that "The primary utility of a search engine is to provide access to accurate information. Disinformation sites that deliberately put out false information to intentionally mislead people directly cut against that utility."

=== Blocking pirating websites ===
In April 2022, TorrentFreak reported that DuckDuckGo had blocked search results for some major pirating websites, including The Pirate Bay, 1337x and FMovies, as well as video downloading software youtube-dl. In a statement to Engadget, DuckDuckGo said that The Pirate Bay and youtube-dl were never removed from its search results if the user searched for those websites using their name or web address. DuckDuckGo also said there were problems with "site:" search queries for these websites and other searches, and that the problem had been fixed.

=== Association with Microsoft ===
In May 2022, a report from Bleeping Computer by security researcher Zach Edwards found that DuckDuckGo Private Browser allowed Microsoft's products, like Bing and LinkedIn, to apply trackers to continue running while visiting non-DuckDuckGo websites, unlike Google and Facebook trackers, which were blocked. In response, Weinberg said: "unfortunately, our Microsoft search syndication agreement prevents us from doing more to Microsoft-owned properties. However, we have been continually pushing and expect to be doing more soon." He also said given that most browsers "don't even attempt" to block third-party scripts from loading, users would still be safer than on other browsers. In August 2022, DuckDuckGo began blocking Microsoft's trackers, saying that the policy preventing them from doing so no longer applied.

=== Criticism of Google ===
In December 2024, DuckDuckGo criticized Google's proposed remedies in an antitrust case related to search engine monopolies. According to DuckDuckGo, the proposal maintains the existing balance of power rather than fostering genuine competition. Weinberg said the proposed measures "attempt to maintain the status quo" and are insufficient to grant smaller players fair access to markets.

== Traffic ==
DuckDuckGo queries per day from 2010 to 2022

In June 2013, DuckDuckGo reported a significant traffic increase; according to its Twitter account, on Monday, June 17, 2013, it had three million daily direct searches. On average, during May 2013, it had 1.8 million daily direct searches. Some relate this claim to the exposure of PRISM and to the fact that other programs operated by the National Security Agency (NSA) were leaked by Edward Snowden. Danny Sullivan wrote on Search Engine Land that despite the search engine's growth "it's not grown anywhere near the amount to reflect any substantial or even mildly notable switching by the searching public" for reasons due to privacy, and he concluded "No One Cares About "Private" Search". In response, Caleb Garling of the San Francisco Chronicle argued: "I think this thesis suffers from a few key failures in logic" because there had been an increase in traffic and because there was a lack of widespread awareness of the existence of DuckDuckGo.

In September 2013, the search engine hit 4 million searches per day. On January 11, 2021, it had 102.2 million daily searches.

Internal surveys by DuckDuckGo found that DuckDuckGo users had a wide variety of political leanings.

As of 2022, DuckDuckGo had about 3% of the search market in the United States.

As of 2026, about 53% of DuckDuckGo's monthly global traffic comes from the United States, 8% from Germany, 5% from the United Kingdom, 3% from Canada and 3% from France.

== See also ==
- Comparison of web search engines
- List of search engines
- Timeline of web search engines
