= WebView =

Embedded web browser in an application

A WebView is a web browser that is embedded within an app. Thus, a WebView is a large-scale software component that enables the use of web content within apps. In some cases, the entire functionality of the app is implemented this way.

The prominent ones are bundled in operating systems:

- Android System WebView, based on Google Chrome
- Apple's WebView for its devices, based on its Safari browser
- Microsoft Edge WebView2

Other examples are Microsoft's legacy WebView, based on its deprecated EdgeHTML and MSHTML engines, and the WebView component in JavaFX.

== See also ==
- Chromium (web browser) § Use in app frameworks
