= AI Mode =

AI feature of Google Search

AI Mode is a search feature used within Google Search. In March 2025, Google introduced an experimental feature named "AI Mode" within its search engine, enabling users to input complex, multi-part queries and receive comprehensive, AI-generated responses. This feature uses Google's Gemini large language model (LLM), which enhances the system's reasoning capabilities and supports multimodal inputs, including text, images, and voice. Users need to be signed in to be able to use the image-generation features. Initially, AI Mode was available through Labs to Google One AI Premium subscribers in the United States, with Google stating that it would use feedback to improve the feature. According to Google, AI Mode expands on AI Overviews with more advanced reasoning and multimodal capabilities for complex, multi-part questions and follow-ups. It uses a "query fan-out" technique that runs multiple related searches across subtopics and combines the results.

== History ==
On May 20, 2025, at Google I/O 2025, Google announced that AI Mode was rolling out to all users in the United States starting that week, no longer limited to Search Labs. AI Mode and AI Overviews also moved to a custom version of Gemini 2.5. Google also announced a "Deep Search" feature for AI Mode that runs dozens or hundreds of searches for a single question and returns a report with links.
