= Kanata Lakes =

- Neighbourhood
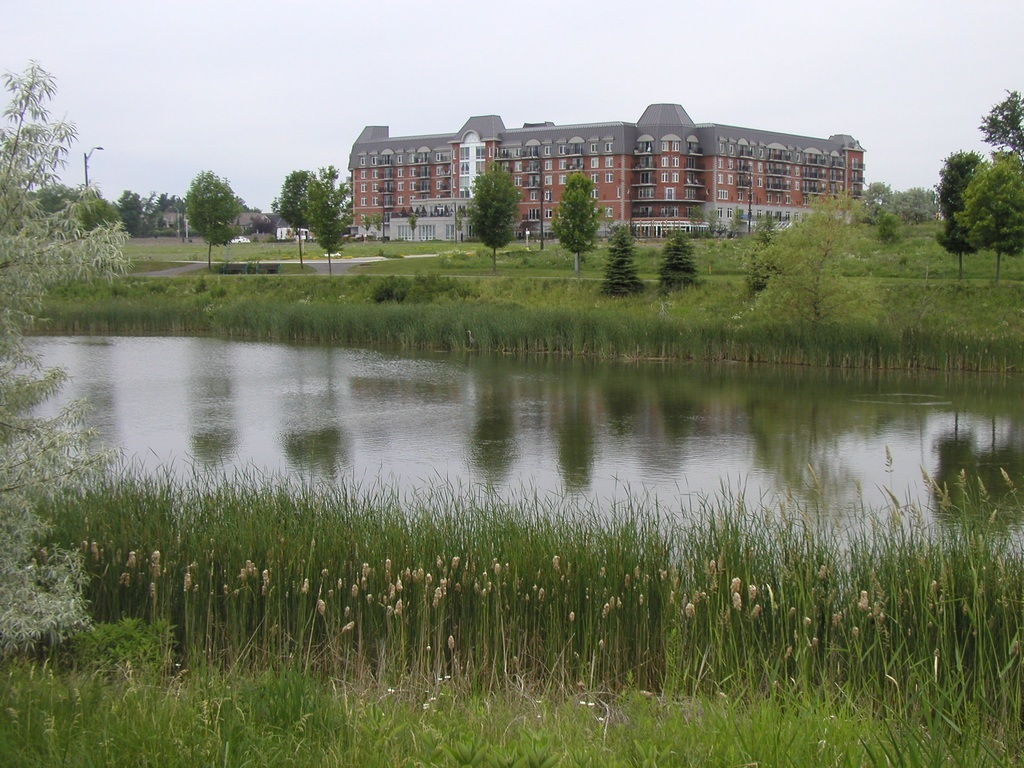

- Location in Ottawa
- Coordinates: 45°18′51.92″N 75°55′28.15″W
- Country: Canada
- Province: Ontario
- City: Ottawa
- Ward: Kanata North
- Incorporated: 1978 (Kanata)
- Amalgamated: 2001 (City of Ottawa)

Government
  - MPs: Jenna Sudds
  - MPPs: Karen McCrimmon
  - Councillors: Cathy Curry
- Elevation: 100 m (330 ft)

Population (2011)
  - Total: 12,668
- Time zone: UTC−05:00 (EST)
  - Summer (DST): UTC−04:00 (EDT)
- Website: Community Association

Kanata Lakes also known as Marchwood-Lakeside is a neighbourhood in Kanata North Ward in the west end of the city of Ottawa, Ontario, Canada. Prior to amalgamation in 2001, it was located within the City of Kanata. It is located north of the Queensway, west of Beaverbrook, east of Terry Fox Drive, and south of Morgan's Grant. Kanata Lakes is located about 20 km (12 mi) west-southwest of Downtown Ottawa.

According to the 2011 Canadian Census, the population of Kanata Lakes was 12,668.

== Features ==
Kanata Lakes' main street is Kanata Avenue, which runs over the Queensway into the neighbourhoods of Katimavik-Hazeldean and Glen Cairn where it becomes Castlefrank Road. Kanata Avenue has four major side roads: Knudson Drive, Walden Drive, Goldridge Drive, Goulbourn Forced Road and Campeau Drive.

== History ==
The area that is today Kanata Lakes was originally part of the Township of March, and was first settled by Europeans in the early 19th century. One site dating from this era is Pinhey's Point. It remained mainly agricultural until the 1960s when it became the site of heavy development. Modern Kanata is largely the creation of William Teron, a developer who purchased 4,000 acres (16 km^{2}) of rural land and set about building a model community: "A Garden City". The lands around the Kanata Lakes Golf & Country Club formed the initial core of Kanata Lakes when it was developed years later.

Currently KNL Developments, a consortium, consisting of Urbandale and Richcraft, as well as Uniform and Cardel, are clear-cutting 2 km^{2} (0.77 sq mi) of the Beaver Pond Forest to facilitate further development of Kanata Lakes.

== Notable buildings and institutions ==
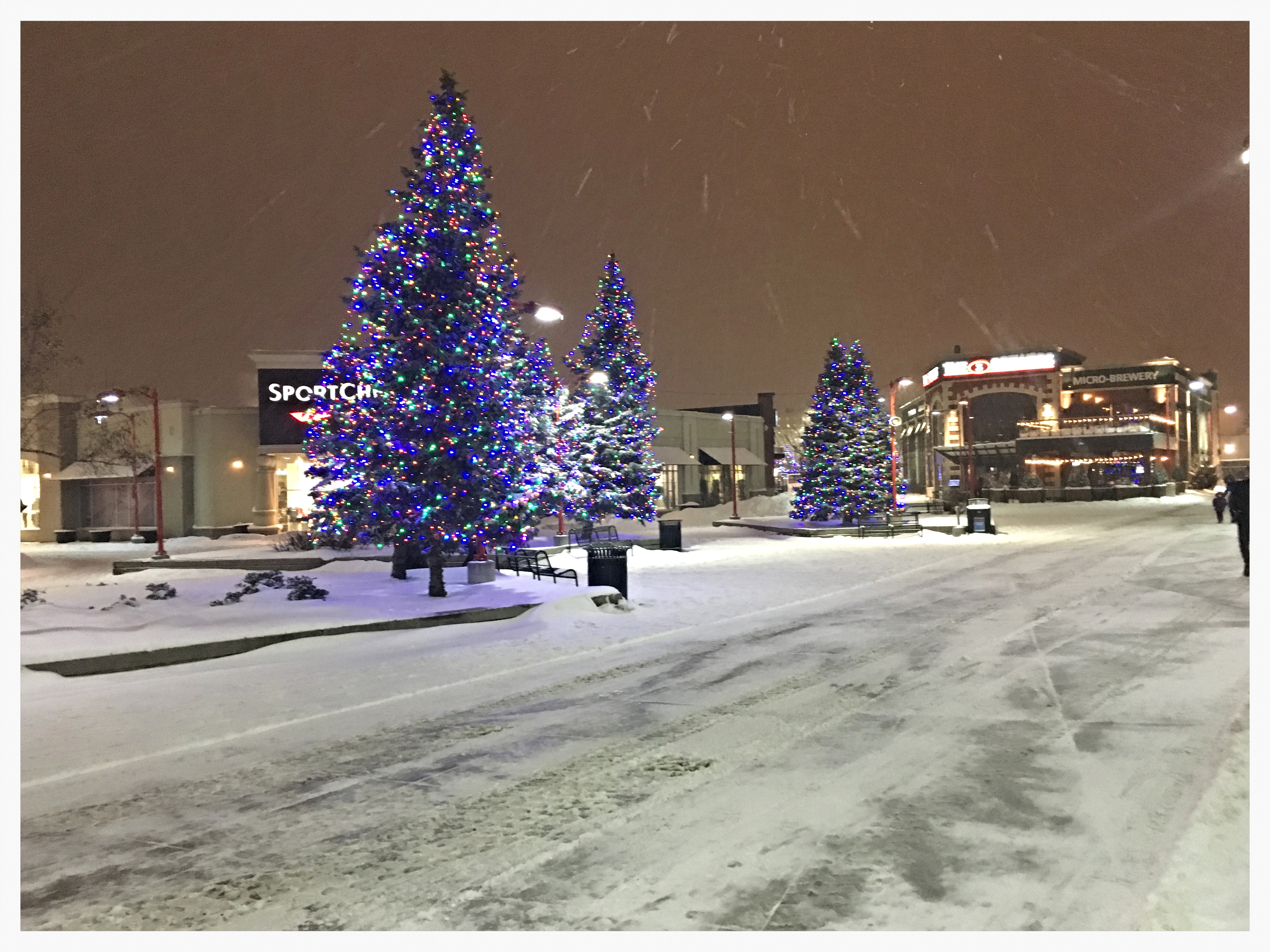
Kanata Centrum

- The Kanata Centrum power centre; together with adjacent developments.
- Landmark Kanata Theatres, the largest movie theatre in Ottawa.

== Sports ==
Kanata Lakes has several sports associations with regular activities, the most visible being the large golf clubs (one of them right in the middle of the town), the sailing club and the bicycle club. There is also Kanata Soccer, March Kanata Tennis Club, Kanata Blazers minor hockey, Kanata Rangers Girls Hockey, Kanata Knights Football, and March Kanata figure skating club.

High school sports such as Earl of March Senior Boys Basketball and All Saints Senior Boys Basketball are very popular as well.

== Arts ==
Arts groups in Kanata Lakes include the Kanata Symphony, Kanata Art Club, and Kanata Theatre.

== Schools ==
- All Saints Catholic High School
- St. Gabriel School
- Earl of March Secondary School
- Georges Vanier School
- W. Erskine Johnson School
- Kanata Highlands Public School

== Notable residents ==
- Terry Matthews - Founder of Kanata Hitech sector
- Chris Phillips - hockey player
