= Kanata, Ontario =

Community in Ontario, Canada

Kanata
- Community
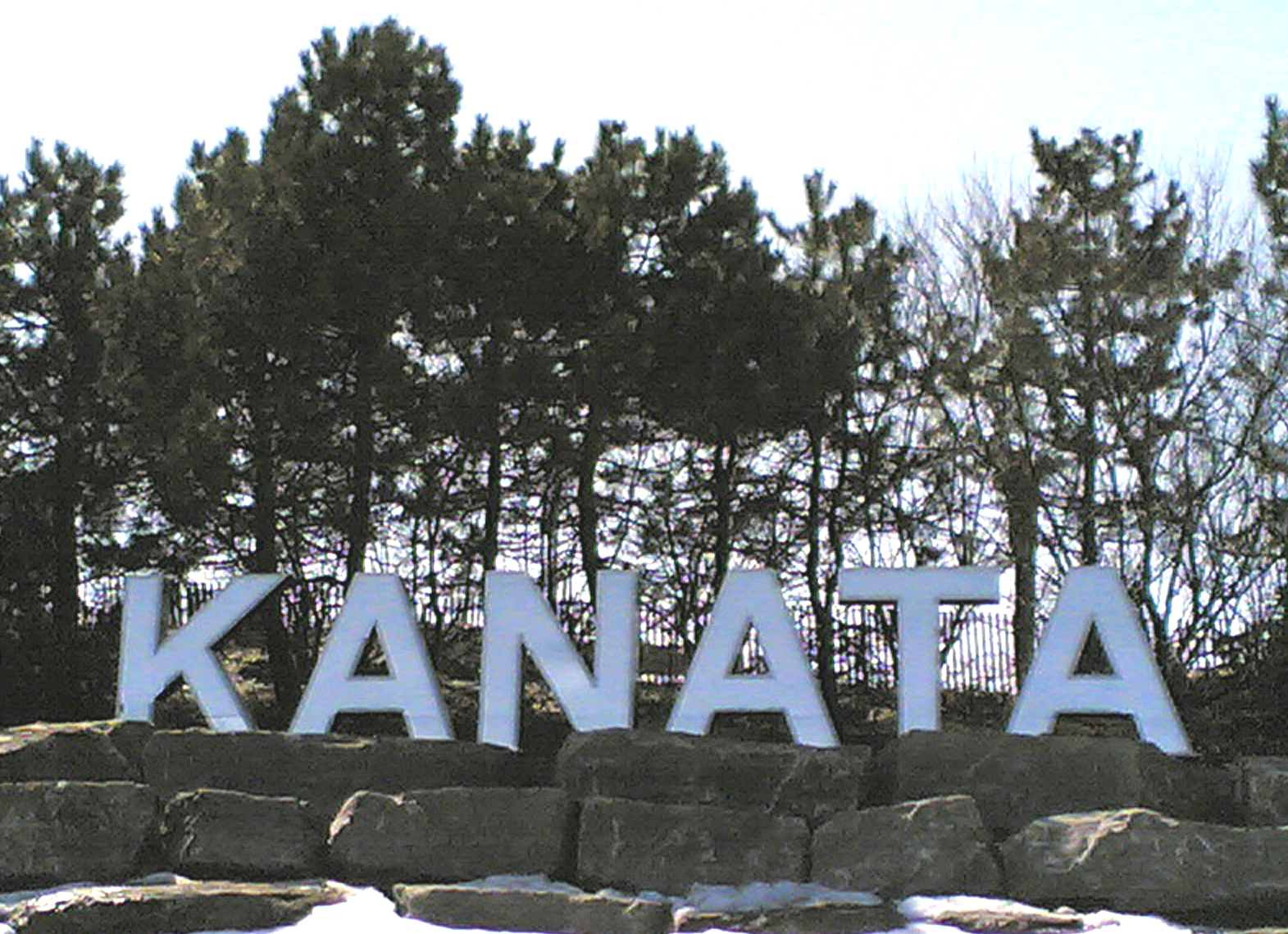
- Three-metre-high sign at Kanata's eastern boundary

- Location in Ottawa
- Coordinates: 45°20′N 75°54′W
- Country: Canada
- Province: Ontario
- City: Ottawa
- Incorporated: 1978; 48 years ago
- Amalgamated: 2001; 25 years ago

Government
  - City councillors: Cathy Curry; Allan Hubley; Clarke Kelly
  - MP: Jenna Sudds (Liberal)
  - MPP: Karen McCrimmon (Ontario Liberal)

Area
  - Community: 133.05 km^{2} (51.37 sq mi)
  - Land: 132.21 km^{2} (51.05 sq mi)

Population (2021)
  - Community: 98,938 (Former city)
  - Urban: 137,118
- Time zone: UTC−5 (EST)
  - Summer (DST): UTC−4 (EDT)
- Postal code FSA: K2L, K2M, K2K
- Area codes: 613, 343, 753
- Website: https://web.ncf.ca/aj624/kanata.html

Kanata (/kəˈnætə/, kə-NAT-ə) is a satellite community and former city within Ottawa, Ontario. It is located about 22 km (14 mi) west of the city's downtown core. As of 2021, the former City of Kanata had a population of 98,938, with the population centre (which includes next-door Stittsville) having a population of 137,118. Before it was amalgamated into Ottawa in 2001, it was one of the fastest-growing cities in Canada and the fastest-growing community in Eastern Ontario. Located just to the west of the National Capital Commission Greenbelt, it is one of the largest of several communities that surround central Ottawa.

== History ==
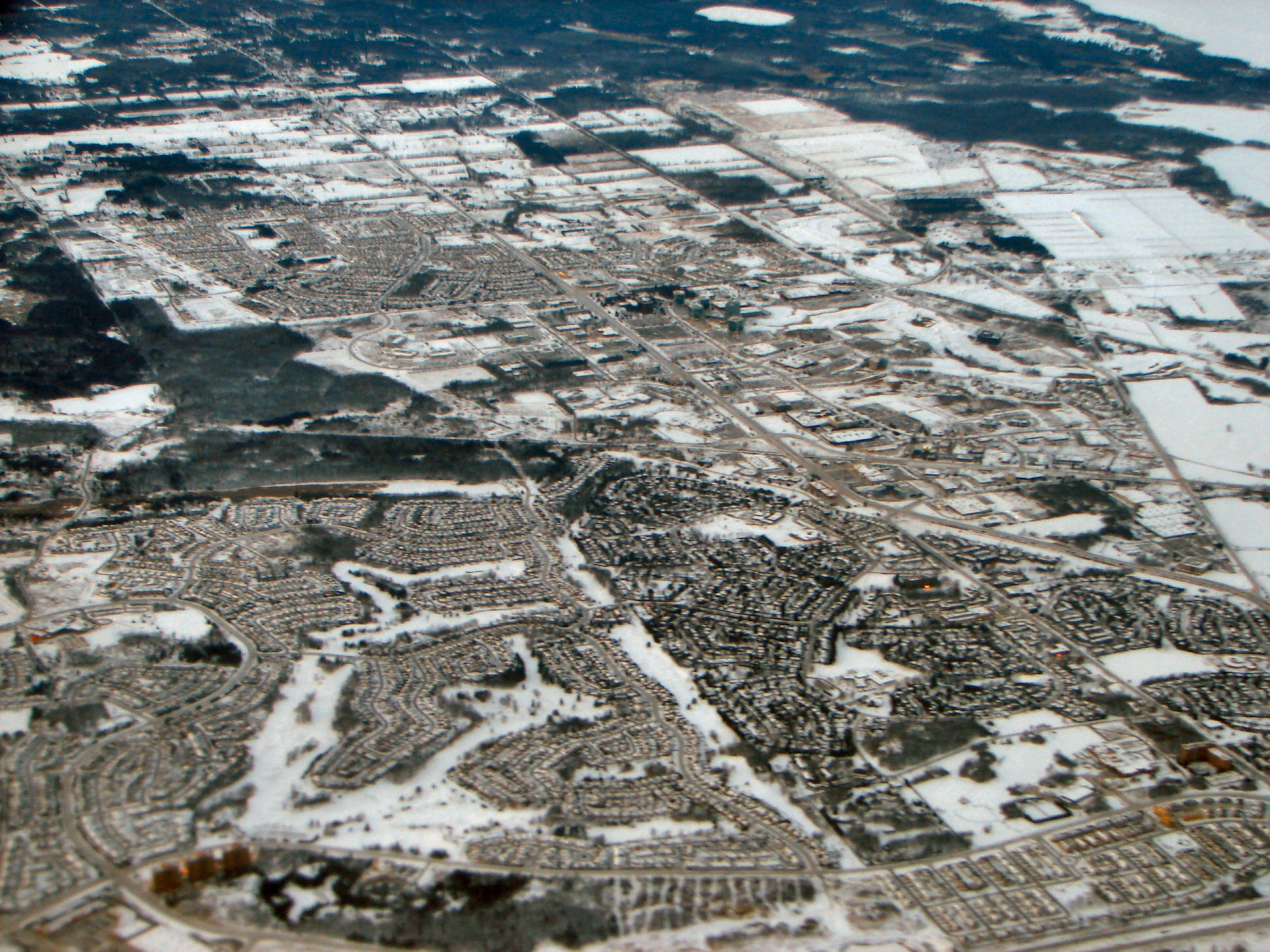
Aerial view of North Kanata, January 2007

Kanata did not originate as a typical historic town or village and the area was originally part of March Township, was first settled by Europeans in the early 19th century. One site dating from this era is Pinhey's Point.

It remained mainly agricultural until the 1960s when it became the site of heavy development. Modern Kanata is largely the creation of Bill Teron, a developer and urban planner who purchased over 1,200 hectares (3,000 acres) of rural land and set about building a model community. Unlike other suburbs, Kanata was designed to have a mix of densities and commercial and residential properties. It had large amounts of open space, and was to be surrounded by a greenbelt. A reflection of the garden city movement, the area was divided into a series of communities, each of which was intended to have its own commercial centre and unique culture. These include Beaverbrook, Glen Cairn, Bridlewood, Katimavik, Hazeldean, Morgan's Grant, and Kanata Lakes. The first street to be built was Tiffany Crescent in 1964.

As part of the overall plan for the city's future, Teron set aside land for a technology park, reasoning that the city could grow a high-tech sector on the foundation of the scientists and researchers already attracted to the area for the dominant government sector in Ottawa. To attract the first high-tech companies to the new city, he offered land to the first technology companies to settle in Kanata at no cost other than the price of servicing, attracting Atomic Energy Canada, Northern Electric and Mitel.

The community grew rapidly due to the influx of hi-tech workers looking to capitalize on the new economic opportunities. The Province of Ontario incorporated Kanata as a city in 1978. The new city's area was formed out of March Township as well as portions of Goulbourn Township and Nepean. The name "Kanata" was chosen in a referendum, defeating "Hazeldean", "March" and "Kairnwood".

On September 20, 1998, the city of Kanata dedicated a cenotaph in Village Green Memorial Park to those who served their country in war and peace.

Kanata remained a city until 2001, when the province created a new (amalgamated) City of Ottawa that included the City of Kanata (pop. 59,700).

The Kanata Avenue–Castlefrank Road overpass next to Royal Canadian Legion National Headquarters, opened in December 2003 and renamed Valour Bridge on December 1, 2006, is dedicated to all Canadians who have served in defence of freedoms in the great battles and campaigns since the turn of the 20th century.

As of the 2006 census, the population of Kanata had increased to 85,000, and was most recently estimated to be just over 90,000. The city became an important hi-tech centre. DEC was one of the pioneer technology companies in Kanata. The DEC campus was later used by Compaq and Hewlett-Packard, and is now occupied by Gilmore Printing. Kanata remains home to many of the major hi-tech employers of Ottawa, such as Ericsson, Avaya, Juniper Networks, Research In Motion, Mitel, March Networks, Nokia, Bridgewater Systems, DragonWave, Solace, Protecode, Dell Canada, HP, Smart Technologies, Norpak, MDS Nordion, Breconridge, AMCC, Cisco, and Ciena. Nortel Networks and the former Bell-Northern Research had a large campus of buildings just outside the Kanata boundary to the east. The hi-tech industry is clustered along March Road, in the Kanata North Business Park and Kanata Research Park, and along Eagleson Road, in the Kanata South Business Park.

== Geography ==
Situated in the Ottawa Valley, Kanata is about 22 km (14 mi) west-southwest of Downtown Ottawa along Highway 417 at a latitude of 45°18' North and a longitude of 75°55' West, with an area of 139 km^{2} (54 sq mi). Its northern end is just to the west of the Ottawa River.

To the east, Kanata is separated from the former City of Nepean by the National Capital Commission's Greenbelt. The community of Bells Corners borders the inner side of the Greenbelt. Bells Corners is itself a hi-tech suburb that was established around 1950, and was home to such Canadian technology icons as Computing Devices Canada, the Ottawa-based defence electronics company (bought by General Dynamics).

Running through the western part of Kanata is the Carp River. Immediately southwest of Kanata are the suburbs of Stittsville and Richmond which are also part of the City of Ottawa. A growing number of people employed in the hi-tech industry reside in the communities of Richmond and Stittsville owing to their close proximity to the larger tech hub of Kanata.

== Main neighbourhoods (North to South) ==
South March: This area of Kanata is north of the Kanata North Business Park on either side of March Road and is bounded by Terry Fox Drive to the south and the urban boundary, which basically runs along the Old Carp Road to the north. Extensive developments are underway towards the north. The development area along the west side of March Road is often referred to as Morgan's Grant, while the development area along the east side of March Road can be referred to as Briarbrook, Briar Ridge and Brookside (depending on what area one is referring to). Many developers have developed the land along the east side.

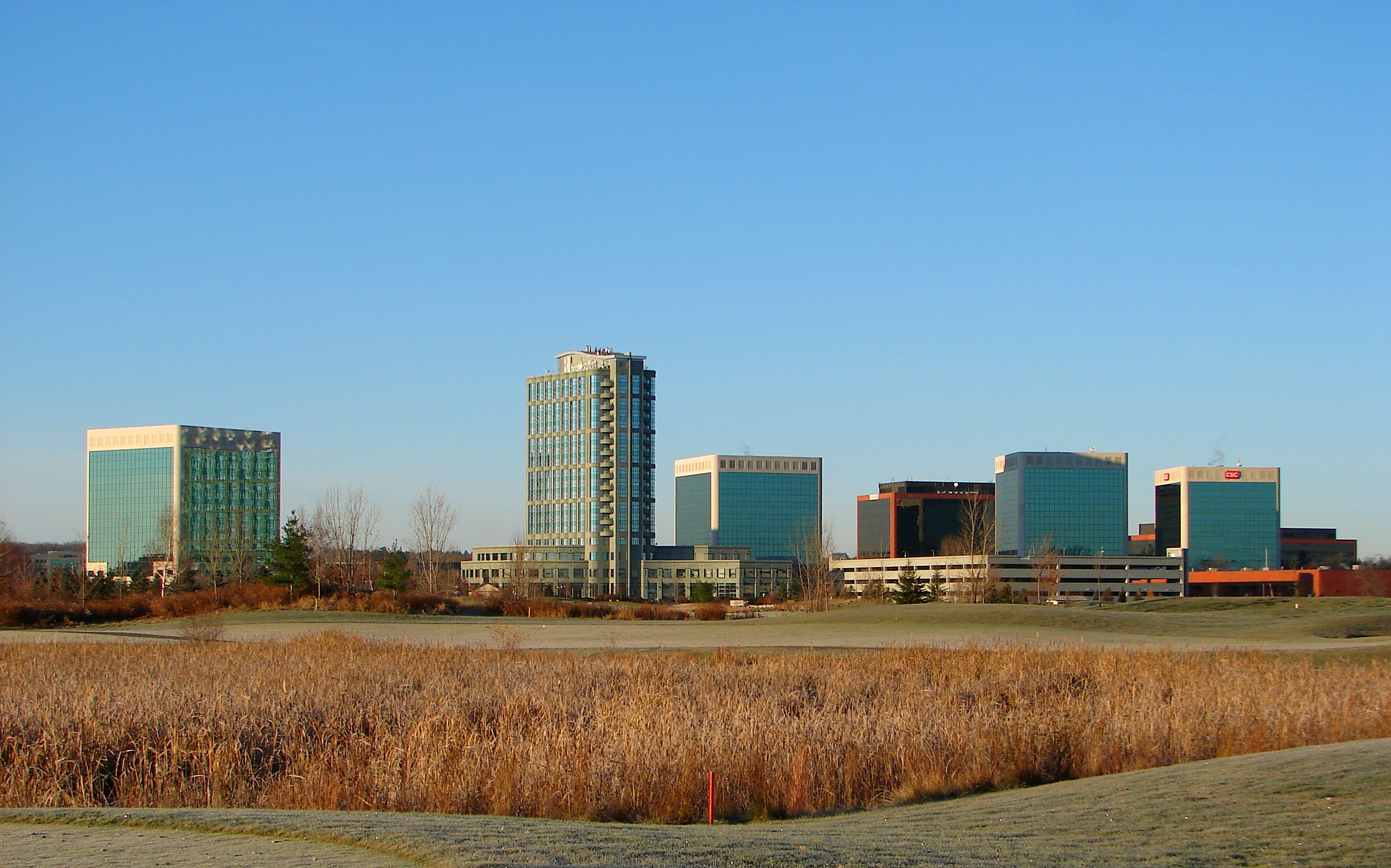
Kanata Research Park and Brookstreet Hotel with Marshes Golf Club in foreground

Kanata North Business Park: Frequently referred to as Silicon Valley North during the late 1990s, this area is bounded by Terry Fox Drive to the north, Herzberg Road to the east, March Road to the south and Goulbourn Forced Road to the west. Many high-tech companies reside in this area including MacDonald, Dettwiler and Associates, BlackBerry, Nokia, Dell, Mitel, Bridgewater Systems, Solace, AMD, Protecode, Inphi Corporation, Ciena, and Cisco. The 18-story, luxury Brookstreet Hotel is in the middle of the Kanata Research Park, surrounded by the first of two urban 18-hole golf courses, called the Marshes Golf Club. Unlike the members-only Kanata Lakes Golf & Country Club, the Marshes Golf Club is open to the general public.

Marchwood Lakeside : Frequently referred to as Kanata Lakes, this area is bounded by Campeau Drive to the south, Knudson Avenue & Weslock Way to the east, Terry Fox Drive to the west and Terry Fox Drive to the north. It has a main arterial street called Kanata Ave. which runs north–south all the way to the 417 (where it then switches to Castlefrank Road that continues south past Glen Cairn). This area has the second of two urban, 18-hole golf courses in Kanata. Unlike the Marshes Golf Course in the Kanata North Business Park, this golf course is not open to the public.

Beaverbrook: Bounded by the Kanata North Business Park to the north, March Road to the east, Campeau Drive to the south and Knudson Avenue & Weslock Way to the west. The first and oldest neighbourhood in Kanata, Beaverbrook is known for its hedged houses and community facilities. Beaverbrook is also home to Canadian businessman Terry Matthews.

Kanata Town Centre: Bounded by Campeau Drive to the north, March Road to the east, Katimavik Road to the south and Terry Fox Drive to the west. The provincial highway 417 bisects this neighbourhood, with most of the undeveloped areas on the north side of the 417. North of the 417, this area has a large mix of high density homes (townhomes and stacked townhomes) to the east, as well as Kanata's major shopping area called Kanata Entertainment Centrum which houses many big-box stores, as well as Landmark Cinemas and its own shopping centre. Between the commercial development and the residential developments to the east, there is a large undeveloped area zoned for high density residential, institutional and commercial spaces. South of the 417, this area again has a mix of residential, institutional and commercial spaces, although the amount of commercial spaces seems to have moved to the newer section of Kanata Town Centre, north of the 417. Again, most of the high density homes are to the east, mainly consisting of townhome developments. As one ventures further to the west, towards Terry Fox Drive, the residential switches from townhomes developments to single family homes.

Terry Fox Business Park: Bounded by the provincial highway 417 & Terry Fox Drive to the north, Terry Fox Drive to the east, Maple Grove Road to the south and Huntmar Drive to the west. Canadian Tire Centre, home arena of the Ottawa Senators, is in the neighbourhood, as well as many newer big-box stores such as Home Depot, Staples, Canadian Tire and more recently Costco. The Bell Sensplex is also in this area, providing Kanata with an additional Olympic sized rink, three NHL sized rinks and an indoor soccer/lacrosse field.

Katimavik-Hazeldean: Bounded by Katimavik Road to the north, Eagleson Road to the east, by Hazeldean Road to the south and Terry Fox Drive to the west.

Glen Cairn: Bounded by Hazeldean Road to the north, Eagleson Road to the east, the Trans Canada Trail to the south, and Terry Fox Drive to the west. Glen Cairn features some low income housing, and is one of the oldest neighbourhoods in Kanata, along with Beaverbrook.

Kanata South Business Park: Bounded by the Trans Canada Trail to the north, Eagleson Road to the east, Fernbank Road to the south and Terry Fox Drive to the west. Again, many smaller high-tech companies are home to the KSBP. Most of this area was undeveloped until just recently. A Real Canadian Superstore recently opened and a large residential/small office development is under construction in the south end of the KSBP.

Bridlewood: Bounded by the National Capital Commission Green Belt to the north and east, Hope Side Road to the south, and Eagleson Road to the west. This area was part of the City of Nepean, but was transferred to the new City of Kanata when it was incorporated in 1978. Still under development, there are several residential projects underway in the core and to the south end of Bridlewood. Parts of southern Bridlewood may also be referred to as Emerald Meadows or Monahan Landing.

== Politics ==
Until 2015, Kanata was in the federal and provincial riding of Carleton—Mississippi Mills. Kanata was the largest centre in the riding, with more than half the population being in Kanata. Both federally and provincially, the riding had tilted strongly conservative, with greater Liberal support in Kanata itself being swamped by more conservative voters in the rest of the riding. Norm Sterling represented the area for decades in the Ontario legislature for the Progressive Conservative Party of Ontario until he lost the nomination to Jack MacLaren in 2011. Federally, the area went Liberal for most of the 1990s, but in 2000, the riding, then known as Lanark—Carleton, was one of only two in Ontario to elect a Canadian Alliance MP. It was easily won by Conservative Gordon O'Connor in 2004, 2006, 2008, and 2011. O'Connor served as a cabinet minister under Stephen Harper from 2006 to 2013.

In 2015, Liberal candidate and Canadian Forces veteran Karen McCrimmon won the newly created riding of Kanata—Carleton, as the new riding had largely become devoid of more conservative rural areas due to population growth.

On the municipal level, the area has been more competitive. From 1994 to 2000, the area was represented on regional council by Kanata native Alex Munter, then a member of the New Democratic Party. In 2000, Munter was elected as the representative to the new Ottawa City Council. Munter retired in 2003 and was replaced by another progressive, Peggy Feltmate. Redistricting prior to the 2006 Ottawa election has seen Kanata divided into two wards, Kanata North and Kanata South. On November 13, 2006, Munter lost to Larry O'Brien in his bid to be mayor of Ottawa, though he carried Kanata. Feltmate won in the ward of Kanata South, and Marianne Wilkinson, seen as one of the more right-wing, developer-friendly members of council, was elected Councillor of Kanata North. Feltmate retired in 2010 and the Kanata South seat was won by Allan Hubley.

=== Mayors ===
1. Marianne Wilkinson (1978–1985)
2. Des Adam (1985–1991)
3. Merle Nicholds (1991–2000)

== Economy ==
First Air, a Canadian airline, had its headquarters in Kanata.

The Kanata Research Park, Canada's largest technology park, is mostly along Terry Fox Drive in the north end of Kanata. Kanata Research Park is a significant location for several hi-tech companies, including Mitel, Ericsson, BlackBerry Canada, Halogen Software, DragonWave, Wesley Clover, Ciena and Nokia.

== Notable buildings and institutions ==
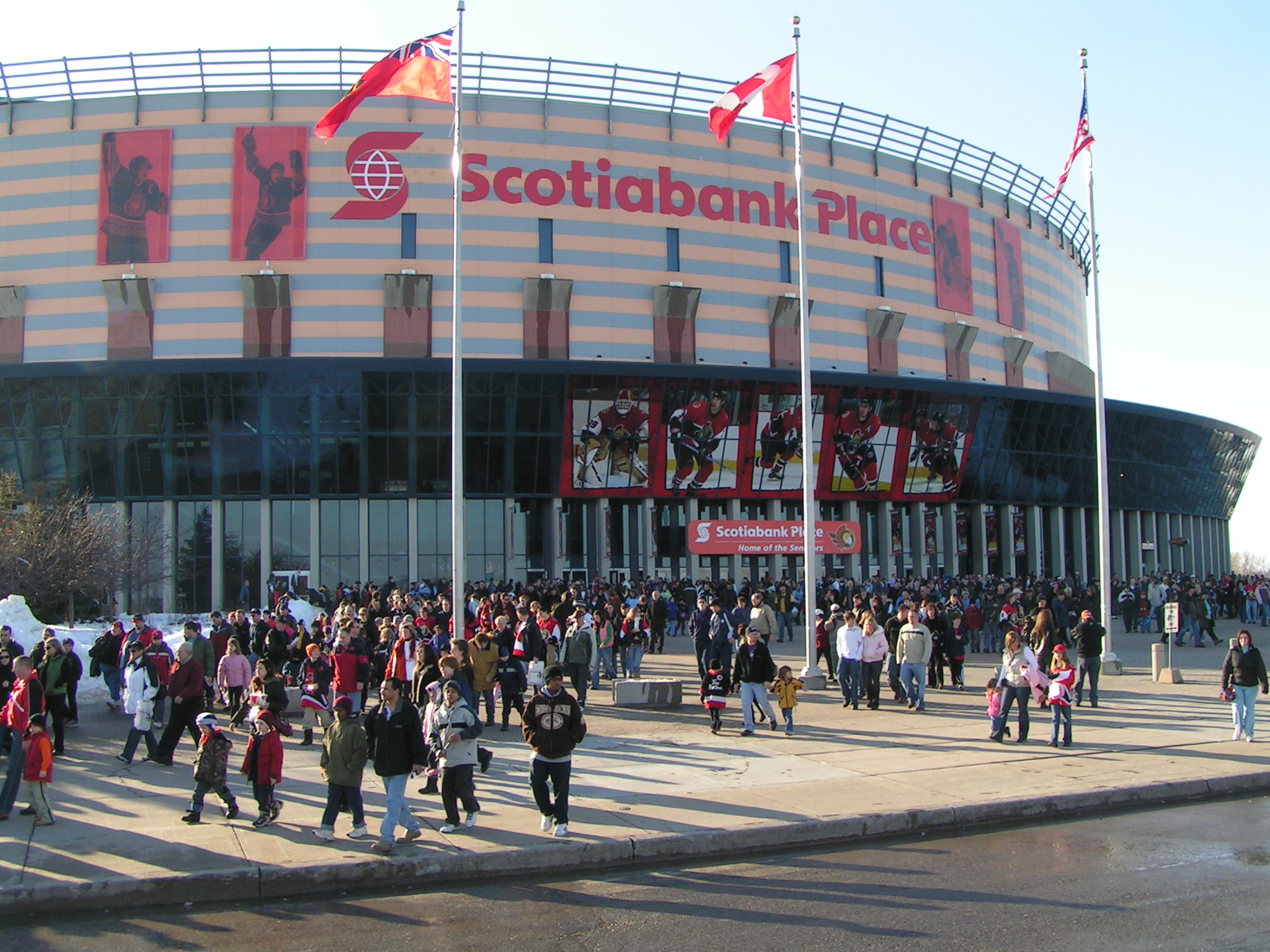
Canadian Tire Centre, with the former name shown

- Canadian Tire Centre, 1000 Palladium Drive. Home arena of the Ottawa Senators of the National Hockey League, some Ottawa 67's hockey games, and many large concerts, such as Bryan Adams, who opened the arena with a show on 15 January 1996, it was known as the Palladium (pre-construction-1996), the Corel Centre (1996–2006), and Scotiabank Place (2006–2013). For several years before the merger, the Canadian Tire Centre was in the City of Kanata, which was in the Regional Municipality of Ottawa-Carleton.
- The Tony Graham Recreation Complex, formally the Kanata Recreation Complex. 100 Charlie Rogers Place; has two NHL sized hockey rinks rated as having the best quality ice in the City of Ottawa which regularly host NHL, AHL and Junior players during summer conditioning, a toboggan hill with a newly constructed outdoor stage in fall of 2025 and a splash pad.
- The Kanata Leisure Centre and Wave Pool, 70 Aird Place
- The Brookstreet Hotel, 525 Legget Drive
- The Kanata Centrum power centre; together with adjacent developments, Ottawa's third largest shopping centre.
- The Royal Canadian Legion's national headquarters, near the Kanata Leisure Centre and the bridge over Hwy. 417 which links Castlefrank Road and Kanata Avenue. The Department of National Defence named the Valour Bridge on 1 December 2006, in an official naming ceremony to honour Canada's Armed Forces.
- Ron Maslin Playhouse, 1 Ron Maslin Place. The 350-seat theatre was completed in 1996, and was funded by an all-volunteer theatre company which was founded in 1968 in the homes of original Kanata residents.
- Bell Sensplex, 1565 Maple Grove Road. Houses four ice rinks (three NHL sized and one Olympic sized), an indoor soccer pitch, Stanley's restaurant, several meeting rooms, and Peak Centre for Performance.
- Landmark Cinemas Kanata 24, in the Kanata Centrum, the largest movie theatre in Ottawa (formerly AMC Kanata 24 and Empire Theatres Kanata 24).
- Jack Charron Arena (formerly The Glen Cairn Arena) on Castlefrank Road at McKitrick Drive
- Hazeldean Branch – Ottawa Public Library
- Glen Cairn Tennis Courts – Four hard-courts plus a practice wall with a clubhouse.
- Hazeldean Mall – indoor shopping mall bounded by Hazeldean Road, Eagleson Road, Carbrooke Street and Abbeyhill Drive
- Tanger Outlet Mall – a large shopping complex across from Highway 417, Canadian Tire Centre and Palladium Auto Park which opened in October 2014.

== Media ==
Kanata's community newspaper is The Kanata Community Voice, distributed every second week to all homes, apartments and businesses in the area. This newspaper was started in March 2018.

The Kanata Kourier-Standard newspaper, Kanata's former community newspaper, was the result of a merger in 1989 between two longtime community newspapers: the Kanata Kourier, launched in 1983 by Alex Munter; and the Kanata Standard, launched in 1965 by Kanata's community association. The paper was sold in November 27, 2017 by Torstar Metroland to Postmedia, who closed the publication January 2018.

== Sports ==
Kanata is home to the Ottawa Senators professional ice hockey team, who play at Canadian Tire Centre. A women's Ottawa Senators team plays at the Tony Graham Recreation Complex. The annual Bell Capital Cup youth minor amateur ice hockey tournament is held at the Sensplex during the Christmas holiday break. The Kanata Lasers, formally known as the Kanata Stallions (and Valley Lasers), were the junior team that played at the Tony Graham Recreational Complex, relocated to Renfrew, Ontario. In 2025, the Almonte Inferno of the National Capital Junior Hockey League relocated to Kanata to become the Kanata Kings. The Kings play their home games at Jack Charron Arena.

The Kanata Soccer Club is the largest sports club in Kanata and the second largest in the city with close to 4,500 players. The Kanata Rhythmic Gymnastics Club is the largest rhythmic gymnastics club in Ontario, and was founded by Head Coach Dasa Lelli in 1975. Following the first rhythmic gymnastics club, Olympia Gymnastics, the first artistic gymnastics and recreational centre in the area, was founded in 2005 on Iber Road.

Kanata is also home to the Kanata Knights football club, one of the 16 teams that play in the National Capital Amateur Football Association (NCAFA). The Knights play and practice at Robert Barr field on 573 Hazeldean Rd. They are rivals of the Bell Warriors, West-Carleton Wolverines and other sports franchises.

== Arts ==
Arts groups in Kanata include the Kanata Symphony, Kanata Civic Art Gallery and Kanata Theatre.

== Schools ==
=== Elementary schools ===
English public elementary schools

- Bridlewood Community Elementary School
- Castlefrank Elementary School
- Glen Cairn Public School
- Jack Donohue Public School
- John Young Elementary School
- Kanata Highlands Public School
- Katimavik Elementary School
- Roch Carrier Elementary School
- Roland Michener Public School
- South March Public School
- Stephen Leacock Public School
- W. Erskine Johnston Public School
- W. O. Mitchell Elementary School

English Catholic elementary schools

- Georges Vanier Catholic School
- St. Anne Catholic School
- St Gabriel Catholic School
- St Isidore Catholic School
- St James Catholic School
- St Martin de Porres Catholic School

French Catholic elementary schools

- École élémentaire catholique Élisabeth-Bruyère
- École élémentaire catholique Roger-Saint-Denis
- École élémentaire catholique Saint-Remi

French public elementary schools

- Ecole Elementaire Publique Grande-Ourse
- École élémentaire publique Maurice-Lapointe

Montessori schools

- Becca's Home Montessori
- Kanata Montessori School
- March Montessori School and Childcare Centre Kanata (Ottawa)

=== High schools ===
Public high schools

- A.Y. Jackson Secondary School
- Earl of March Secondary School

Catholic high schools

- All Saints Catholic High School
- Holy Trinity Catholic High School

== Demographics ==
Population history for the former City of Kanata

- Population (2011): 80,781
- Population (2006): 70,078
- Population (2001): 58,636
- Population (1996): 47,909
- Population (1991): 37,344
- Population (1981): 19,728
- % change (2001–2006): 19.5
- Dwellings: 24,044
- Area (km^{2}): 132.21
- Density (persons per km^{2}): 530.1

=== Population by neighbourhood ===
Neighbourhood	Population (2021)	Population (2016)	Population (2011)	Population (2006)	Population (2001)	Population (1996)	Population (1991)	Area (km^{2}.)	Density (per km^{2}.)	Census tract(s)
Beaverbrook	5,094	5,158	5,182	5,247	5,581	5,754	5,770	2.592	1964.975	5050160.02
Briarbrook / Brookside	5,919	5,915	5,464	2,132	N/A (Note: Census Tract did not exist during these censuses.)			5.66	1045.797	5050160.11
Bridlewood	9,691	10,280	10,199	9,916	8,807	7,557	5,011	2.890	3353.287	5050161.03, 5050161.04
Emerald Meadows / Monahan Landing	16,133	14,120	11,048	9,251	7,539	4,260	1,636	3.513	4592.371	5050161.05, 5050161.06
Glen Cairn / Trailwest	15,963	11,836	9,406	8,892	9,085	8,829	9,057	6.397	2495.388	5050162.02, 5050162.03, 5050162.04
Lakeside	6,552	6,762	7,049	6,988	5,808	3,877	1,301	3.403	1925.36	5050160.07
Kanata Town Centre / Village Green	6,109	5,355	4,694	4,574	2,666	1,560	771	2.498	2445.752	5050160.06
Katimavik-Hazeldean	9,315	9,415	9,861	10,242	10,795	11,042	10,892	3.189	2920.978	5050160.05, 5050160.04
Marchwood / Arcadia	10,990	8,562	4,869	3,215	1,446	27	N/A	11.33	969.991	5050160.14, 5050160.15
Morgan's Grant	9,590	10,342	9,505	6,558	4,299 (Note: Includes Briarbook/Brooksdie for these censuses.)	2,534	N/A (Note: Census Tract did not exist during this census.)	4.423	2,168.212	5050160.12, 5050160.13
Rural former March Township	3,762	3,578	3,504	3,063	2,610	2,469	2,878 (Note: Includes Morgan's Grant, and Briarbook/Brooksdie for this census)	88.511	42.503	5050160.09
Total	99,118	90,806	80,781	70,078	58,636	47,909	37,316 (Note: Kanata had a total population of 37,344, however the combined population of its census tracts was 37,316)	134.406	737.452	
