= Earl of March Secondary School =

Location
- 4 The Parkway; Kanata, Ottawa, Ontario, K2K 1Y4; Canada; 45.3232°N 75.8951°W

Information
- Motto: Tuum Est (It is Yours)
- Founded: 6 December 1971
- School board: Ottawa Carleton District School Board
- Superintendent: Amy Hannah
- Area trustee: Alysha Aziz
- Administrator: Lucy Bridgstock
- Principal: Christine Siwy
- Grades: 7–12
- Enrollment: 1,974 (2022)
- Language: English; French
- Campus size: 24 acres (9.7 ha)
- Campus type: Suburban
- Colours: Green, White, Gold, and Black
- Team name: Earl of March Lions
- Communities served: Beaverbrook; Kanata Lakes; Katimavik-Hazeldean; Kanata Estates
- Feeder schools: Katimavik Elementary School (grade 9 only), Stephen Leacock Public School, W. Erskine Johnston Public School, Roland Michener Public School, St. Gabriel Catholic School, Georges Vanier Catholic School, Kanata Highlands Public School
- Public transit access: Yes (OC Transpo)
- Website: earlofmarchss.ocdsb.ca

Earl of March Secondary School is an Ottawa-Carleton District School Board secondary school in Ottawa, Ontario, Canada. It is located in suburban Kanata in the Beaverbrook neighbourhood near the Ottawa Public Library Beaverbrook Branch and the John G. Mlacak Centre. The school also serves the neighbourhoods of Kanata Lakes, Beaverbrook, Katimavik-Hazeldean, Richardson Ridge, and Morgan's Grant.

== History ==
The Earl of March Secondary School opened on December 6, 1971, and was the only secondary school in the area that would become the City of Kanata (later to be amalgamated within the City of Ottawa). The school was designed by Balharrie, Helmer, and Gibson architects and engineers for the Carleton Board of Education (which became part of the Ottawa-Carleton District School Board) and was built for CA$5.5 million. The school featured a 750-seat auditorium, a large gymnasium with a balcony, a smaller exercise gym, a large cafeteria, a library, specialized science, technology, and arts rooms; as well as several "flexible" learning spaces. The school took its name from Charles Lennox, 4th Duke of Richmond and Earl of March, who served as Governor General of British North America in the early 19th century.

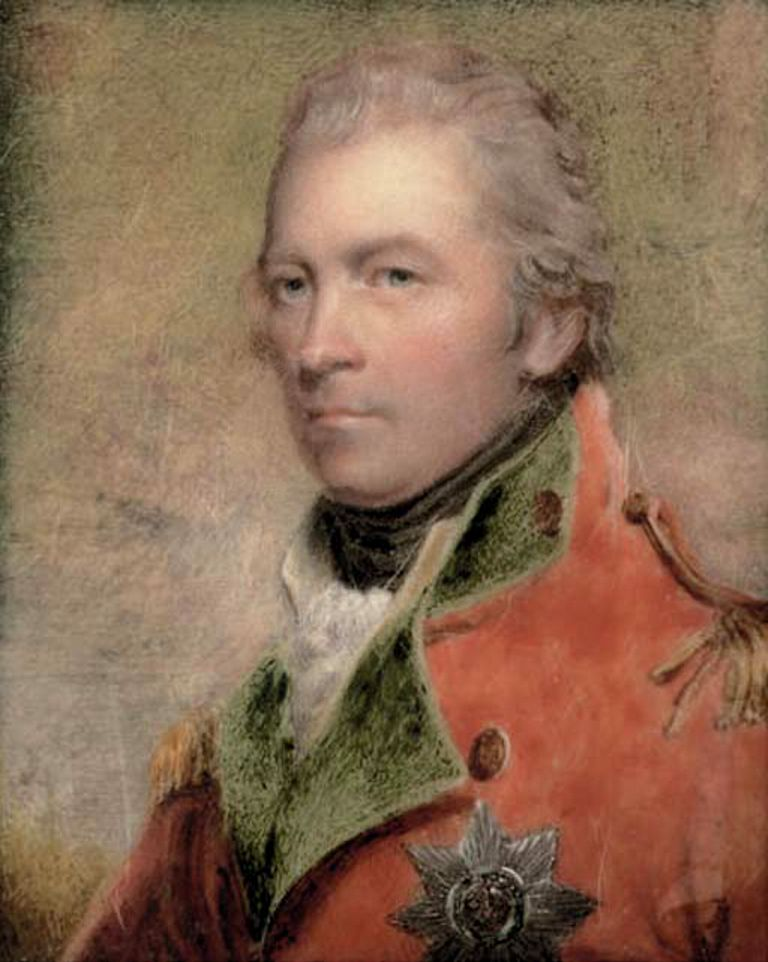
Charles Lennox, 4th Duke of Richmond

When the school opened, the Earl of March's catchment area was a large part of the Regional Municipality of Ottawa–Carleton, encompassing March, Huntley, Torbolton, and Fitzroy townships and part of Goulbourn Township. As such, Earl of March served for many years as the sole high school for Ottawa's then-nascent northwestern suburbs outside the Greenbelt. As Kanata started to rapidly expand in the late 1970s to the 1990s, other high schools were built and the catchment area was made smaller to prevent excessive over-crowding. Today, the Earl of March is one of five public high schools, three Catholic high schools, and several private high schools that now facilitate the area.

The school has undergone several renovations and additions, the first major one being in 1979 when an elevator, a wheel-chair ramp, and several mechanical doors were added into the building to make it wheel-chair accessible, as well as a renovation to the auditorium and arts wing to add more storage space and a better sound system.

In the 1980s, the auditorium, library, arts wing and tech wings were renovated to add more music rooms to the school to facilitate the school's large music program. The old music room which shared space with the back section of the stage was removed, the old art and drama rooms were turned into two new music rooms and a group practice room was turned into a keyboard lab for a keyboard classes (which has since been turned back into a group practice space). The art rooms were moved to two new classrooms added at the back of the library, making it significantly smaller, and the drama room was moved to the old mechanical drafting room.

During the 1990s, the tech department was renovated to better accommodate the new drama room, as well as better safety systems, a wood-working lab, a metal-working lab (including welding) and a machine shop. The second floor of the school also received renovations, adding five new computer labs to the building and adjusting the layout of some of the internal classrooms to accommodate. Several of the flexible classroom spaces were removed during this period.

In 2002 the auditorium was renovated again, the stage was made larger on either side, the last remains of the old music room were taken out, new seats were added in one of the lecture theatres and one of the seating sections, as well as a new stage light dimming system was installed.

In 2009, the science classrooms were renovated to fix possible gas and water leaks in the old wooden benches and desks, as well as to remove safety issues regarding climbing stairs with chemicals. The old science rooms were similar to the lecture theatres, with rows, each on a step higher than the last, of wooden benches and desks. The new science rooms feature lab-grade counters forming a U-shape around the outside of the room facing in towards the centre where labs can be completed. The centre of the room contains regular desks for note-taking, and the front of the room has the teachers counter as well as smart boards for writing notes. The new science rooms also feature proper fume-hoods for handling chemicals, which are sometimes used by the computer technology department for soldering.

In 2014 the school received funding for a new $17 million wing for grades seven and eight which officially opened, along with a new office and guidance department, on December 3, 2015, despite having been in use since the start of the school year as of early September 2015. The wing was created in order to relieve over-crowding from two feeder schools. The new two-story wing features 25 classrooms, a double gymnasium, two music rooms, and a drama room. It shares the cafeteria, library, computer labs, and auditorium with the high school. The new wing has already elected its own student council, put on its own musical, created its own band and arts programs, and has started several other traditions. The office and guidance spaces were created on the first floor, directly below where they used to be on the second. The old office and guidance spaces were turned into an exercise gym and a community living class respectively. The new office contains 10 new offices for principals and councillors, a meeting room, new working areas for the office secretaries and guidance technician, better storage and archive space, a new PA system for the school to replace the old original one. The entire area is laid out to optimize the tight space. This new wing means the Earl of March is the first school in the OCDSB to switch from a 9-12 to a 7-12 and the second school to follow the 7-12 model.

Over the summer of 2017, several classrooms on the second story were renovated to accommodate the Earl's growing science department. These science rooms have the same layout and configuration as the science rooms renovated in 2009. As part of the renovation, a computer lab was relocated to an empty classroom at the end of the hall. The school took the opportunity to refresh the computer science and technology learning in the school, and turn the new computer lab into a modern technology learning area.

During the new year of 2019, the school experienced damages due to flooding in the science labs. The pipes froze & burst during the winter break as the heating was turned off while students were not attending school. As a consequence, the school was closed for an extra day to resolve the issues.

== Academics and athletics ==
The school was one of the first in the Ottawa area to offer French immersion instruction at the secondary level, as well as the first school in Ontario to offer an Advanced Placement (AP) program.

Earl of March features a large 750 seat auditorium. Four sections of the auditorium can be partitioned off into lecture theatres that can be used as classrooms. During the 1970s and 1980s, the auditorium was used by the Kanata Theatre before building their own theatre; it was also used during the 1980s by Kanata United Church before they built their own building. The auditorium is used for things such as meetings, school assemblies, concert band practices, and concerts, as well as the yearly school musical.

Earl of March sports teams go by the nickname of the Lions. Many sports are offered.

== Notable alumni ==
- Jenn Hanna; curler
- Gavin McInnes; Canadian commentator, co-founder of Vice Media, founder of the Proud Boys
- Roger Hardy; Clearly co-founder
- Eric Howard; rugby player
- Mark Lee; sportscaster
- Trevor Matthews; film producer and actor

== See also ==
- Education in Ontario
- List of secondary schools in Ontario
