= KRP Properties =

Canadian real estate corporation

- Type: Private
- Industry: Commercial real estate
- Founded: 1986
- Headquarters: Kanata, Ontario, Canada
- Owner: Wesley Clover
- Website: www.krpproperties.com

KRP Properties (formerly Kanata Research Park Corporation) is a Canadian real estate corporation in Kanata, Ontario, Canada, which leases and develops commercial real estate. It operates the business parks known as Kanata Research Park and Kanata North Technology Park.

In 2016, KRP Properties acquired nine additional commercial office buildings in a $70 million deal, expanding its portfolio beyond Kanata for the first time.

The parks are home to many companies, mostly IT-related, such as Mitel, Ericsson, March Networks, Huawei, Hewlett-Packard, Amdocs, DragonWave, Solace, Pleora Technologies, Protecode, TSMC Design Technology Canada, Halogen Software and Nokia. There are also Ciena and Cisco locations in the area. It is also home to the Brookstreet Hotel and the Marshes Golf Club.

As of 2018, Martin Vandewouw is president of KRP Properties. The supporting management team includes Linda Sprung (VP of Leasing & Marketing), Terry Young (VP of Operations), Richard Goldstein (VP of Construction & Development), Catherine Robidas (VP of Finance) and J.Patrick Ferris (General Counsel and Corporate Secretary).

In 2015, KRP Properties was selected for the Sustainability Award at the 2015 Ottawa Business Awards. They were selected because of their efforts towards integrating energy and waste reduction, water conservation, green cleaning and sustainable purchasing into all aspects of their business operations.

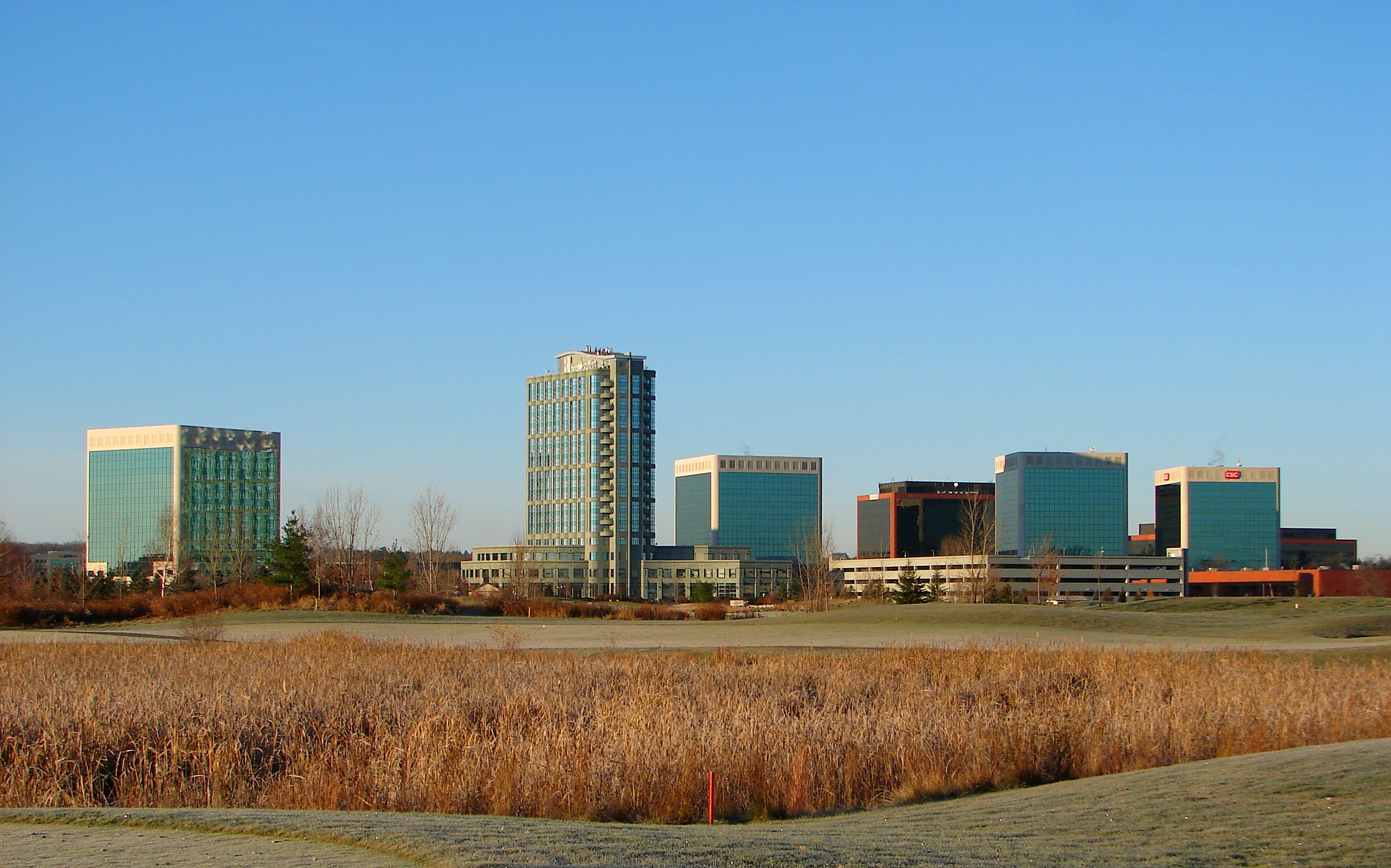
Skyline of KRP Properties and Brookstreet Hotel with Marshes Golf Club in foreground

== See also ==
- List of research parks
