= Bridge Growth Partners =

American private equity fund

- Industry: Private equity fund
- Founded: 2013; 13 years ago
- Headquarters: New York City, United States
- Key people: Joseph M. Tucci (chairman and co-founder); Alok Singh (CEO and co-founder); Alison Catchpole (Chief Financial Officer and Chief Compliance Officer)
- Website: www.bridgegrowthpartners.com

Bridge Growth Partners (est. in 2013) is an American private equity fund that invests in technology and financial services companies. Bridge Growth's portfolio holdings include BackOffice Associates, Accedian, Finalsite, Salient CRGT, and Solace Corporation.

== History ==
In November 2014, Bridge Growth acquired CRGT, a systems integrator based in Reston, Virginia, a deal reportedly valued at $255M. In August 2015, CRGT was merged with Salient to form Salient CRGT.

In April 2016, Bridge Growth Partners acquired Solace Systems, a developer of middleware software and messaging appliances, in a leveraged buyout. The company would subsequently be renamed Solace Corporation. In September 2016, the firm invested in Finalsite, a provider of online learning and communications products, based in Glastonbury, Connecticut.

In March 2017, it announced a majority equity investment in Accedian, based in Montreal, Canada, which develops service assurance and performance monitoring solutions for communications service providers. In August 2017, Bridge Growth Partners announced the purchase of Goldman Sach's stake in BackOffice Associates, a data services firm. After the deal Bridge Growth became the majority stakeholder with Goldman Sachs, SAP, and management team members holding the remaining equity.

== See also ==
- List of venture capital firms
