= Just So (musical) =

- Music: George Stiles
- Lyrics: Anthony Drewe
- Book: Anthony Drewe
- Productions: 1984 Watermill Theatre; 1990 Tricycle Theatre, London; 1998 Goodspeed Opera House; 2001 North Shore Music Theatre; 2003 Starlight Theatre; 2005 Chichester Festival; 2006 Globe Theatre; 2008 Kanata Theatre; 2010 Birmingham Rep. 2018 Barn Theatre, Cirencester; 2021 Watermill Theatre; 2026 Birmingham Hippodrome

Just So is a musical by Anthony Drewe and George Stiles written in 1984 based on the Just So Stories by Rudyard Kipling. Just So was originally produced by Cameron Mackintosh at the Watermill Theatre and in 1990, also by Mackintosh, at the Tricycle Theatre in London. It has been subsequently produced at various theatres in the US and UK.

== Synopsis ==
Act One

The Eldest Magician begins by reading a story to the Best Beloved ("Just So"). All of the animals did as the Eldest Magician asked except for Pau Amma the Crab, who would go out looking for food twice a day, causing large areas of the land to flood ("Another Tempest"). The elephants gather round the watering hole to discuss the tyranny of the Crab. The Elephant's Child decides "There's No Harm in Asking", and so, he asks a series of "Silly Questions". They are interrupted by the Crab's feed and are forced to move to higher ground.

The Elephant's Child and the flightless Kolokolo Bird journey to the "Limpopo River" in search of the Crab. Travelling in a small raft, the two are washed up on an uninhabited island where the Parsee Man and his beloved Cooking Stove can no longer cook, as the Crab constantly floods the crops ("Living on This Island"). Rhinoceros bursts on stage complaining about his "Thick Skin" and continues on his way. Parsee Man and the cooking stove agree to cook a special cookie made out "Butter, Sugar and Flour". Parsee Man shows the Elephant's Child and the Kolokolo Bird "The Parsee Cake-Walk". Once the cake is completed, Rhino leaps forward and rushes off with it, leaving the Parsee Man and the cooking stove vowing to get revenge ("The Crime").

The Elephant's Child and the Kolokolo Bird set sail once again. The raft reaches the coast of Africa, where they meet the animals on the High Veldt ("The Chase"). When the Elephant's Child asks for help in finding the Crab, Jaguar and Leopard offer a deal: they will help find the Limpopo River in exchange for help finding Giraffe and Zebra. When the Elephant's Child asks why, Jaguar and Leopard cheerfully explain ("We Want to Take the Ladies Out"). The travelers feel they should warn the other animals, so they convince Giraffe and Zebra to join them ("Pick Up Your Hooves and Trot"). The Eldest Magician moulds and shapes the light beam to fall on the animals in such a way as to hide the giraffe and zebra. The two are transformed into their patchy and stripey patterns ("Jungle Light").

The Elephant's Child politely asks the Crab to stop playing with the sea. Pau Amma laughs and vows to go out and hunt for food seven times a day now so that the waters will never be still. The Kolokolo Bird convinces The Elephant's Child that they must continue their way to the Limpopo River and think of something to stop the Crab ("Limpopo River (Reprise)").

Act Two

The Eldest Magician is interrupted by the arrival of the Elephant's Child and the Kolokolo Bird having an argument ("The Argument"). The Eldest Magician introduces The Elephant's Child to the Kangaroo, who sings about how normal his legs used to be ("Aboriginally I Came"). He wanted, however, to be more powerful and so the Eldest Magician recruited the Dingo Dog to chase him, building up the muscles in the Kangaroo's legs ("Leaps and Bounds"). As he ran he began to hop, and as his legs got larger he hopped so much that he could run no more. As Kangaroo exits he warns the Elephant's Child: "Sometimes you get what you want, sometimes you get what you deserve".

Back in the jungle, the Kolokolo Bird sits wondering why she always makes herself wait ("Wait a Bit"). The two cats appear and tie her up, just as the Elephant's Child bursts through to rescue her. The Jaguar offers to let the bird go in exchange for the whereabouts of the Zebra and the Giraffe. Now perfectly camouflaged by their new skins, Giraffe and Zebra taunt and tease them. The Elephant's Child offers to show the Leopard and the Jaguar how they can change their skins too in exchange for his and the Kolokolo Bird's freedom. The cats agree and use smoke ("Just So (Reprise)") to acquire new hides of their own.

The Elephant's Child is searching for Kolokolo Bird in order to apologize ("Does the Moment Ever Come"). The Parsee Man and the Cooking Stove enter in a boat made from an upturned Crab shell with the Rhino swimming close behind. The Rhino blames the Parsee Man for ruining his skin, as he filled it with crumbs whilst the Rhino was swimming. He prepares to charge at the Parsee Man's Cooking Stove, but the Parsee Man begs the Rhino ("Please Don't Touch My Stove"). Rhino, Parsee Man, and the Cooking Stove all agree to be friends.

The Elephant's Child sees water in the distance and exclaims they must be at the Limpopo River. The Crocodile invites him to come over, offering to give the Elephant's Child directions if he will give him a meal ("Little One Come Hither"). Eventually, the Elephant's Child pulls free and the Crocodile slinks back into the water. The Elephant's Child is embarrassed to see that his nose has been pulled into a trunk. The Kolokolo Bird encourages him to look on the bright side of having such a long nose.

The Elephant's Child notices the abandoned Crab shell and realizes how they can defeat the Crab ("If"). As the Crab emerges from the water, the Eldest Magician casts a spell on the Crab which makes him shrink. When the Eldest Magician asks the other animals what to do with the Crab, the Elephant's Child prompts him to let the Crab go to play in the sea, where he can no longer harm anyone.

All of the animals and the Eldest Magician celebrate their victories and their uniqueness with a grand finale ("Just So (Reprise)/Limpopo River (Reprise").

== Musical numbers ==
Act 1

1. "Just So" – Full Company
2. "Another Tempest" – Elephants
3. "There's No Harm on Asking" – Elephant's Child, Eldest Magician
4. "Silly Questions" – Elephant's Child, Elephants
5. "The Limpopo River" – Eldest Magician, Kolokolo Bird, Elephant's Child, Company
6. "Living on This Island" – Parsee, Cooking Stove, Elephant's Child, Kolokolo Bird
7. "Thick Skin" – Rhino
8. "The Parsee Cake-Walk" – Parsee, Full Company
9. "The Crime" – Kolokolo Bird, Elephant's Child, Parsee, Cooking Stove
10. "The Chase" – Giraffe, Zebra, Jaguar, Leopard
11. "We Want to Take the Ladies Out" – Jaguar, Leopard
12. "Pick Up Your Hooves" – Giraffe, Zebra, Kolokolo Bird, Elephant's Child
13. "Jungle Light/Just So (Reprise)" – Full Company
14. "Act One Finale/The Limpopo River (Reprise)" – Kolokolo Bird, Elephant's Child, Eldest Magician, Full Company

Act 2

1. "Entr'acte" – Eldest Magician
2. "The Argument" – Elephant's Child, Kolokolo Bird
3. "Wait a Bit" – Kolokolo Bird
4. "Aboriginally I Came" – Kangaroo, Dingo Dog, Eldest Magician
5. "Leaps and Bounds" – Eldest Magician, Kangaroo, Dingo Dog, Wallabies
6. "Leaps and Bounds (Reprise)" – Kangaroo
7. "The Chase (Part 2)/Just So (Reprise)" – Jaguar, Leopard, Giraffe, Zebra, Wildebeests
8. "Does the Moment Ever Come?" – Elephant's Child
9. "Please Don't Touch My Stove" – Parsee Man, Cooking Stove, Rhino, Elephant's Child
10. "Little One Come Hither" – Crocodile, Elephant's Child
11. "Wait a Bit (Reprise)" – Kolokolo Bird, Elephants
12. "If" – Eldest Magician, Kolokolo Bird, Elephant's Child, Full Company
13. "Just So (Reprise)/The Limpopo River (Reprise)" – Full Company
14. "Finale" – Full Company

== Characters ==
Main characters:

- Elephant's Child: Central to the plot of the story. A generally kind-hearted, excited but curious elephant who can often be a little reckless.
- Kolokolo Bird: Elephant's Child's reluctant and cynical guide, often known to make a joke; a bird that is too afraid to fly.
- Eldest Magician: Both a character and the Narrator, the Eldest Magician tells the story to the audience and interacts with the characters on their journeys, acting as a God-like figure.

Secondary characters:

- Parsee Man: An Indian man who is a French chef and lives on an island with only a cooking stove for company.
- Cooking Stove: The Parsee Man's most beloved possession.
- Rhino: A lazy, messy, braggy creature with tight skin.
- Giraffe: Zebra's friend, more open minded than Zebra.
- Zebra: A diva, Giraffe's best friend.
- Jaguar: The smarter member of the Leopard/Jaguar duo.
- Leopard: The idiot member of the Leopard/Jaguar duo.
- Pau Amma: A giant crab, who plays with the sea, the shows antagonist.
- Kangaroo: A humble creature, with huge legs, he is used to be vain.
- Dingo Dog: The wild dog sent to chase Kangaroo.
- Crocodile: The crocodile lives in the Limpopo and is a very shady character.
- King Elephant: Elephant's child's dad
- Queen Elephant: Elephant's child's mum

Ensemble:

- Elephants: Are not at all curious, and shun the Elephant's child for asking such 'silly questions'.
- Wildebeests: They are the Giraffe and Zebra's friends, but the Giraffe and Zebra aren't theirs.
- Wallabies: The supporters, cheerleaders, and fangirls of both Kangaroo and Dingo Dog.

== Selected casts ==
| Character(s) | Original 1984 Watermill Theatre cast | 1990 London cast | 2005 Chichester Festival Theatre & cast recording | 2018 Cirencester cast | 2021 Watermill Theatre cast | 2026 Birmingham Hippodrome cast |
|---|---|---|---|---|---|---|
| Elephant's Child | Nathan Campbell | Richard Henders | Richard Dempsey | Lewis Cornay | Eleanor Kane | Daniel Lee |
| Kolokolo Bird | Emma Redmond | Linzi Hateley | Julie Atherton | Molly Lynch | Emma Lucia | Sophie Ellis-Kemp |
| Eldest Magician | William Pool | Gary Bond | John Barrowman | Duncan Drury | Nathanael Campbell | Stanley Searl |
| Parsee | Clive Rowe | Clive Rowe | Ahmet Ahmet | Kiran Patel | Dan De Druz | Sam Darcy |
| Cooking Stove | Todd Kane | Tom Robbins | Anthony Drewe | Evie Rose Lane | Peter Mooney | Victoria Mokumo |
| Giraffe | Jane Morton | Nadia Strachan | Alexis Owen-Hobbs | Imogen Halsey | Emma Morton | Millie Henderson |
| Zebra | Laura Anderson | Sharon Benson | Akiya Henry | Rosalind Ford | Laura Guimarães | Daisy Winbolt-Robertson |
| Jaguar | Mark Inscoe | Clinton Derricks | Dean Hussain | Dylan Wynford | Dan De Cruz | Kit Barnes |
| Leopard | Daniel Parker | Tico Wells | Simon Grieff | Grant Urquart | Kemi Clarke | Samuel Palliser Kehoe |
| Rhino | Martyn Ellis | Martyn Ellis | Nicolas Colicos | Michaela Stern | Alexander Bean | Joshua Simango |
| Kangaroo | Simon Cranfield | David Schneider | Andrew Spillett | David Tinston | Peter Mooney | Lucas Theodorou |
| Dingo Dog | Rachel Lee | Jenna Russell | Daniele Coombe | Sophie Lane | Emma Morton | Florence Swann |
| Crocodile | | | | | | Archie Elliot |
| King Elephant | | | | | | Patrick O Grady |
| Queen Elephant | | | | | | Tochi Arinze |
| Wallaby | | | | | | Felix Richardson-Horscroft |

== Cast recording ==
The 2005 production of the show was recorded with the Chichester Festival Theatre cast (including Julie Atherton, and Richard Dempsey) and also featuring John Barrowman as the Eldest Magician, and Anthony Drewe as the cooking stove, but it does not include all the numbers, particularly "Aboriginally I".
