= Kanata Theatre =

Coordinates: 45.295748°N 75.900813°W

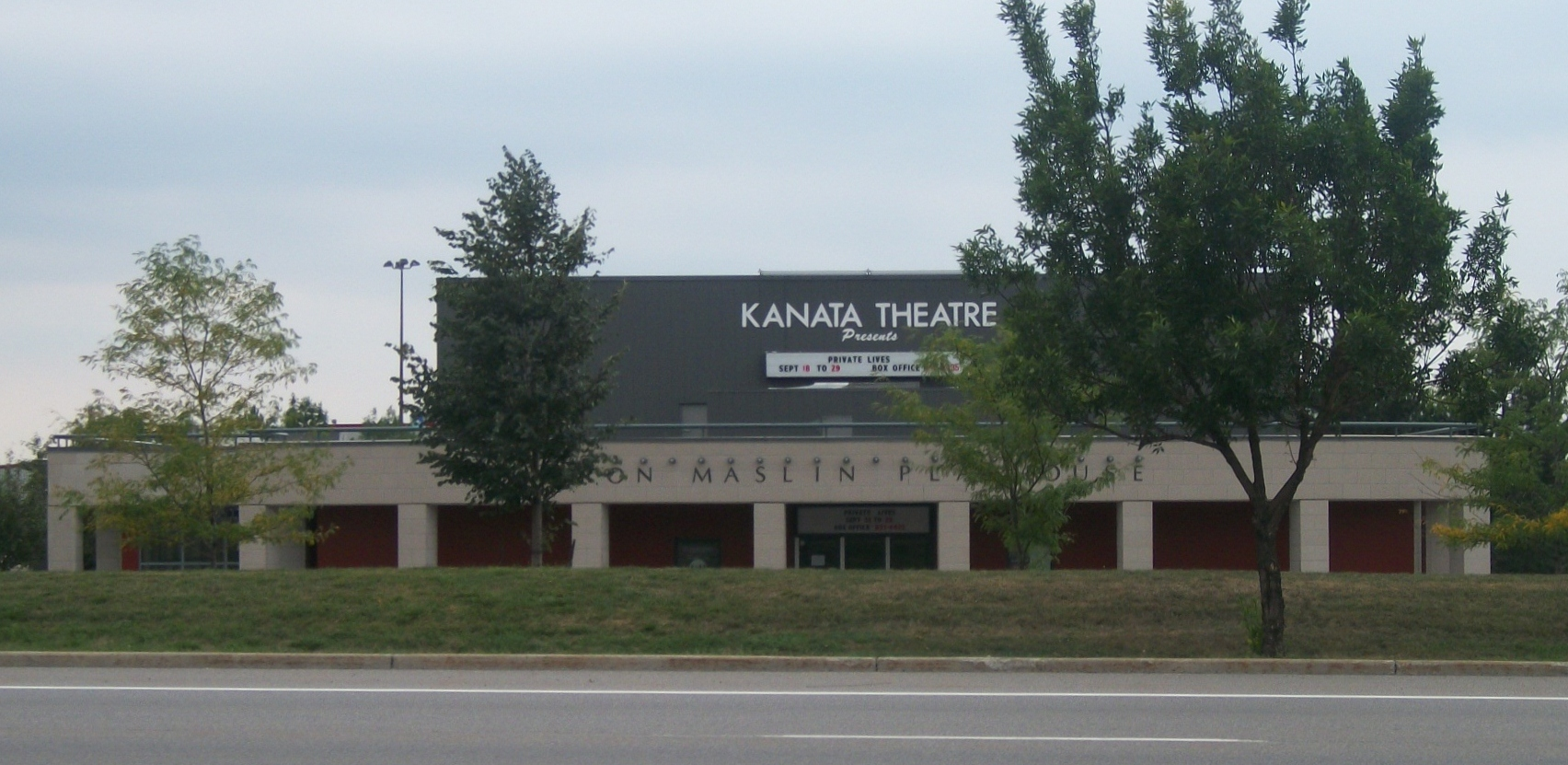
- Interactive map of Kanata Theatre
- Address: 1 Ron Maslin Way; Ottawa, Ontario; K2V 1A7
- Type: Community theatre

Website
- Kanata Theatre

Kanata Theatre (informally known as KT) is a community theatre organization, operates the Ron Maslin Playhouse, a 350-seat theatre located in the Kanata district of Ottawa, Ontario, Canada. It was opened in May 1996 by Merle Nicholds, then the mayor of Kanata. The Building was designed by Peter Smith, who also designed the Princess of Wales Theatre in Toronto. They stage 6 plays a year including and annual family musical.

== History ==
In 1968, Kanata Theatre began as a play reading group in a sleepy bedroom community. At that time the town consisted of only a handful of houses, one public school, two gas stations, a post office and an A&P grocery store.

In 1993 several major developments brought the dream of having their own performance venue closer to reality. The group conducted a feasibility study that convinced the members to spend Kanata Theatre's $300,000 reserve fund on a playhouse project. On Kanata Theatre's initiative, the City of Kanata allocated roughly half of its new federal/provincial infrastructure funding to that project, set aside land at Walter Baker Park, and gave Kanata Theatre the right to manage the building under a lease. By the spring of 1994 the project was under way.

Peter Smith of the firm of Lett/Smith, Governor General's award winner for his restoration of London's Grand Theatre, designer of Toronto's Princess of Wales Theatre, and long time architect for the Shaw Festival, was chosen to design the building.

Kanata Theatre took possession of its new home in March 1996 and in May of that year staged its first production in the Playhouse, Oscar Wilde's The Importance of Being Earnest. The move to the Playhouse was followed by a large increase both in the group's membership and its audience. In 2001 the Playhouse was expanded by the addition of a rehearsal studio, postponed for budgetary reasons from the original construction, an expanded lobby and other facilities. Kanata Theatre covered the entire cost of this expansion.

== Production history ==
2023/2024	2022/2023	2021/2022	2019/2020	2018/2019	2017/2018	2016/2017
Glorious	The Marvelous Wonderettes	10 Minute Plays (Various)	A Comedy Of Tenors	Don't Dress For Dinner	Vanya And Sonia And Masha And Spike	The Last Romance
Twelfth Night	Doubt, A Parable	The Savannah Sipping Society	Operation Mincemeat	It's A Wonderful Life: A Radio Play	Arsenic And Old Lace	Equivocation
A Christmas Story	Just So	Tarzan	You're A Good Man, Charlie Brown	Madagascar: A Musical Adventure	Sleuth	High School Musical
Mauritius	Almost, Maine	Outside Mullingar	The Curious Incident Of The Dog In The Night-time	Silent Sky	Anne Of Green Gables	The Melville Boys
Brighton Beach Memoirs	Having Relations	The Death of Me	Quartet (Cancelled due to COVID-19)	A Man For All Seasons	Shatter	Treasure Island
Baskerville	Quartet (Rescheduled from 2020)	Opening Night (Rescheduled from 2020)	Opening Night (Cancelled due to COVID-19)	Nunsense	A Year In The Death In The Death Of Eddie Jester	Schoolhouse

== Location ==
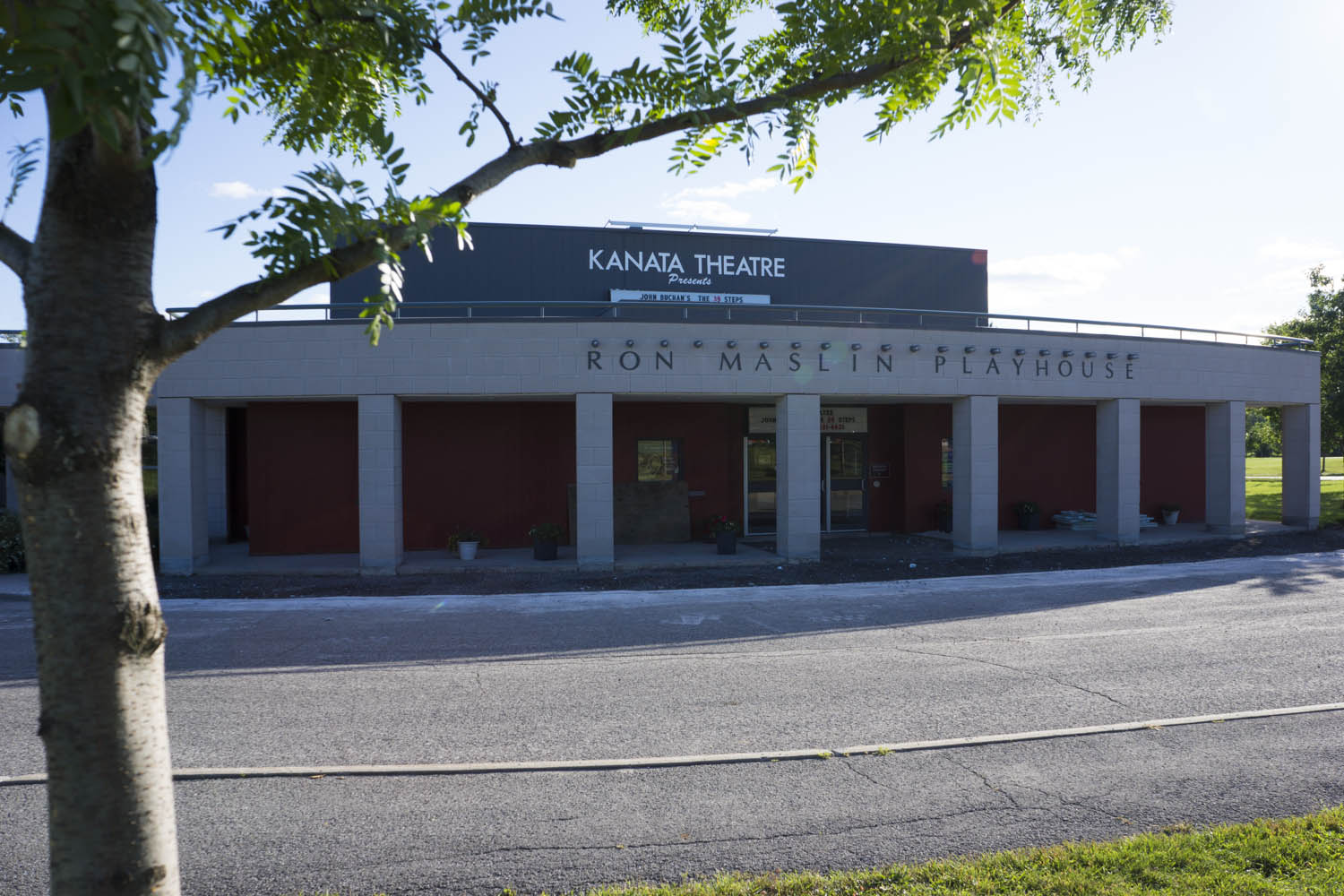
Ron Maslin Playhouse, public theatre in Kanata, Ontario, Canada.

The theatre is located at 1 Ron Maslin Way, near the Queensway (Highway 417) on the western side of Kanata, just off Terry Fox Drive. There is public parking and bus access by OC-Transpo.

== Performances ==
Genres presented include musical theatre, theatre, dance.

== Funding ==
Funding for the construction for the theatre came from Kanata Theatre's own building fund. Funding also came from a federal-provincial infrastructure grant, while the then City of Kanata provided the site.

Construction began immediately, pouring the concrete foundation and then backfilling.

== Organization ==
Kanata Theatre is a member-based all-volunteer organization. All performers and staff are volunteers with an interest in theatre, including box office, ushers and other front of house duties to the stage crew, stage lighting and sound.

== 40th Anniversary Season ==
In celebration of Kanata Theatre 40th anniversary, Kanata Theatre was given the honor of hosting the 2009 Theatre Festival at the Ron Maslin Playhouse. The Visiting theatre groups from across Ontario were presenting their best productions each evening from May 13 to 16, with an Awards Brunch on May 17.
