= Roger Hardy =

Canadian Internet entrepreneur and businessman

- Born: November 11, 1969 (age 56); Toronto, Ontario, Canada
- Occupations: businessman, CEO
- Employer: Hardy Capital

Roger Vincent Hardy (born November 11, 1969) is a Canadian Internet entrepreneur and businessman. He is the chairman, and CEO of Hardy Capital. He is also Chairman and co founder of Kits Eyecare, Kits.com the worlds fastest growing eyecare company and a public company listed on the Toronto Stock Exchange. Hardy is also the co-founder and former chairman, and CEO of Coastal Contacts Inc. (TSX: COA, NASDAQ: COA), which he sold to Essilor for $430 million in cash in 2014. At the time the largest ecommerce sale in Canadian history.

== Early and personal life ==
Hardy was born in Toronto, Ontario and grew up in Eastern Canada where he attended Earl of March Secondary School. After graduating from Bishop's University, Hardy’s passion for skiing pulled him to the West Coast. He spent a year skiing in Whistler and came to the decision that BC was his home.

While attending university, Hardy was a member of many sports teams where his competitive nature garnered him the Most Valuable Player of the year award. Later in his career, it was this competitive spirit that helped Hardy succeed in an online industry in which thousands had entered, and failed.

Hardy currently resides in Vancouver, British Columbia with his wife and children.

== Career ==
=== Coastal Contacts Inc. ===
Hardy first worked for a transportation and logistics company, followed by a contact lens company. While working at the contact lens company, Hardy recognized that purchasing contact lenses was expensive, time consuming and service constrained for consumers.

In 2000, Hardy founded Coastal Contacts Inc. The Company started in a basement office with one phone line, a 14K modem, a ping pong table and a Visa card. Hardy purchased the keyword “contact lens” from AltaVista and Snap.com. This keyword was not known to have any value at the time and no other companies were advertising on the keyword. Hardy bought the exclusive rights to “contact lenses” and launched with that advertising. In the first day, they had 30 orders; within the first month, they had $68,000 in sales.

Under Hardy's direction, Coastal Contacts Inc. became the world's largest online retailer for eyewear. In 2001, Coastal achieved $1 million in cumulative revenue. In 2004, the company began trading on TSX. In 2008, the company launched eyeglasses business unit. In 2012, Coastal surpasses $1 billion in cumulative sales since 2000 and starts trading on NASDAQ.

Coastal Contacts Inc. and Essilor signed an agreement on February 27, 2014, that it is acquiring Coastal Contacts Inc. for C$430 million.

=== 510 Seymour Street, Vancouver ===
In 2014 Hardy funded and acquired a development property at 510 Seymour Street in Vancouver B.C. The building has a total of 750,000 sq. ft. and was completed in January 2017.

=== B.C.'s Living Legends ===
Roger was recognized as one of B.C.'s most influential business leaders and featured as one of 13 Living Legends who have made a profound impact on B.C.'s communities, industries and economy.

=== Shoes.com ===
Roger Hardy was the co-founder, Chairman, and CEO of Shoes.COM, formerly known as Shoeme.ca. Under Hardy’s leadership, the parent company acquired both OnlineShoes.com and Shoes.COM. On May 20, Shoes.COM announced it had raised net proceeds of approximately $45 million. As of May 2015, SHOES.COM was valued at $320 million and was awarded the " Fastest growing company in Canada " title by Profit magazine. The company went bankrupt in January 2017 and was sold to Walmart in a $9 million dollar transaction.

== Awards ==
In 2002, Hardy was recognized as Top 40 under 40 Award by Business in Vancouver. In 2006, Hardy was awarded the Ernst & Young Entrepreneur of the Year Award (Business to Consumer). In 2016, Hardy was again awarded the Ernst & Young Entrepreneur of the Year Award (Business to Consumer). In 2009, Hardy received Bishop's University Top 10 After 10 Award in 2009.

== Philanthropy ==
=== Hardy Family Foundation ===
The Hardy Family Foundation was formed shortly after the sale of Coastal Contacts with an endowment. The goal of the foundation is to give back to the community and institutions that have supported the Hardy Family. Philanthropic contributions have been made in areas of Mental Health, education (with more than $1 million provided to West Point Grey Academy, and more than $500 0000 provided to Bishops University) Police foundation work (>$150 000), Cancer, and children's advancement (>$250 000 to support the Duke of Edinburgh Award). The Foundation has grown substantially due to investments in other Hardy Capital projects and now stands at more than $30 million.

=== Hardy Endowment Fund ===
Hardy established the Hardy Endowment Fund at Bishops University which will pay the tuition for a student "in need" each year in perpetuity. This fund has grown substantially and now funds many students academic pursuits. Hardy is responsible for donating to and contributing countless hours along with his team at Coastal Contacts Inc. over the past years to charities close to their hearts. Easter Seals, The Ride to Conquer Cancer, The Greater Vancouver Food Bank, ORBIS Canada and The Red Cross are some of the many charities that he is involved with. Hardy has also contributed more than 1 million pairs of free glasses to people in developing countries such as Mexico, El Salvador and Kenya, as well as disadvantaged people in Canada through Coastal Contacts Inc.’s own charity project, Change the View, which was founded by Hardys wife Jenny.
