= Accedian =

Canadian information technology company

- Type: Private
- Industry: Software and hardware
- Genre: Network communication and application monitoring
- Founders: Patrick Ostiguy and 4 partners
- Headquarters: Montreal, Canada
- Owners: Bridge Growth Partners

Accedian was a Canadian company that developed network communication and application monitoring software and hardware. Headquartered in Montreal, Canada, the company was majority owned by Bridge Growth Partners, until its acquisition by Cisco in September 2023.

== History ==
Accedian was founded by Patrick Ostiguy and 4 partners in 2004. The company originally developed service assurance hardware and software for telecommunications service providers, including mobile network operators. The first product was a backhaul networks interface device, which links cell towers to central offices. Accedian has since made network function virtualization and virtualized customer-premises equipment (V-CPE) products.

In March 2017, Accedian announced a US$100M investment by Bridge Growth Partners in return for a major equity stake.

In February 2018, Accedian announced that it had acquired Performance Vision of Paris, France for an undisclosed amount. Performance Vision developed network performance management and application performance management solutions. In 2020, Dion Joannou was CEO of Accedian.

In June 2023, Cisco announced its intent to acquire Accedian, and it completed the transaction in September of the same year.
