= Hamnett Kirkes Pinhey =

Canadian politician

See also Pinhey's Point Historic Site

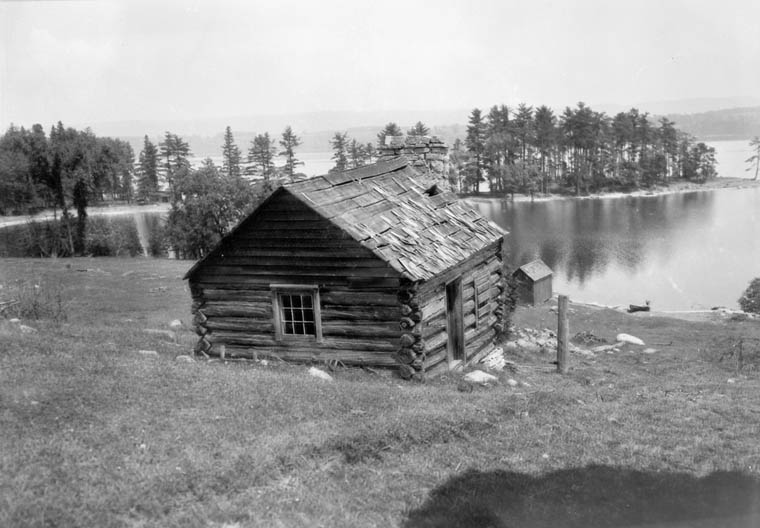
View of an early Pinhey family homestead in March Township with the Ottawa River in the background.

Hamnett Kirkes Pinhey (11 December 1784 – 3 March 1857) was a Canadian landowner and politician.

== Early years ==
Pinhey was born in Devonshire, England, in 1784 to Mary Townley and William Pinhey. He was educated at Christ's Hospital in London and became a grocery and insurance merchant, a partner in Pinhey and Crosley: Merchant and Ship Insurance Brokers. Pinhey spoke fluent French and German, and was a King's messenger who also claimed to have been a secret spy of the Crown to the King of Prussia during the Napoleonic Wars. By the age of 35, Pinhey had made enough money to retire comfortably from business.

Pinhey married Mary Ann Tasker on 12 December 1812.

Hamnett Pinhey was now a wealthy middle-class man, but thanks to the class system in place in England at the time, Pinhey was not able to gain the power or privilege he desired. Seeking greener pastures, Pinhey petitioned the Earl of Bathurst, Secretary of State for War and the Colonies at the time, for lands in Upper Canada and received a land grant. Originally, Pinhey requested 1,200 acres (4.9 km^{2}). He was granted 200.

== The Move to Upper Canada ==
In 1820, Pinhey travelled to March Township in Upper Canada and settled at a site on the Ottawa River. He and his clerk spent the first winter in a one-room log cabin, but soon built a larger one and half story log house and stone kitchen. His wife, children and possessions followed in 1821. With the family came 55 crates with clothing, plate, furniture, books and other items to allow the family to live comfortably in Upper Canada.

== Horaceville and the Stone House ==
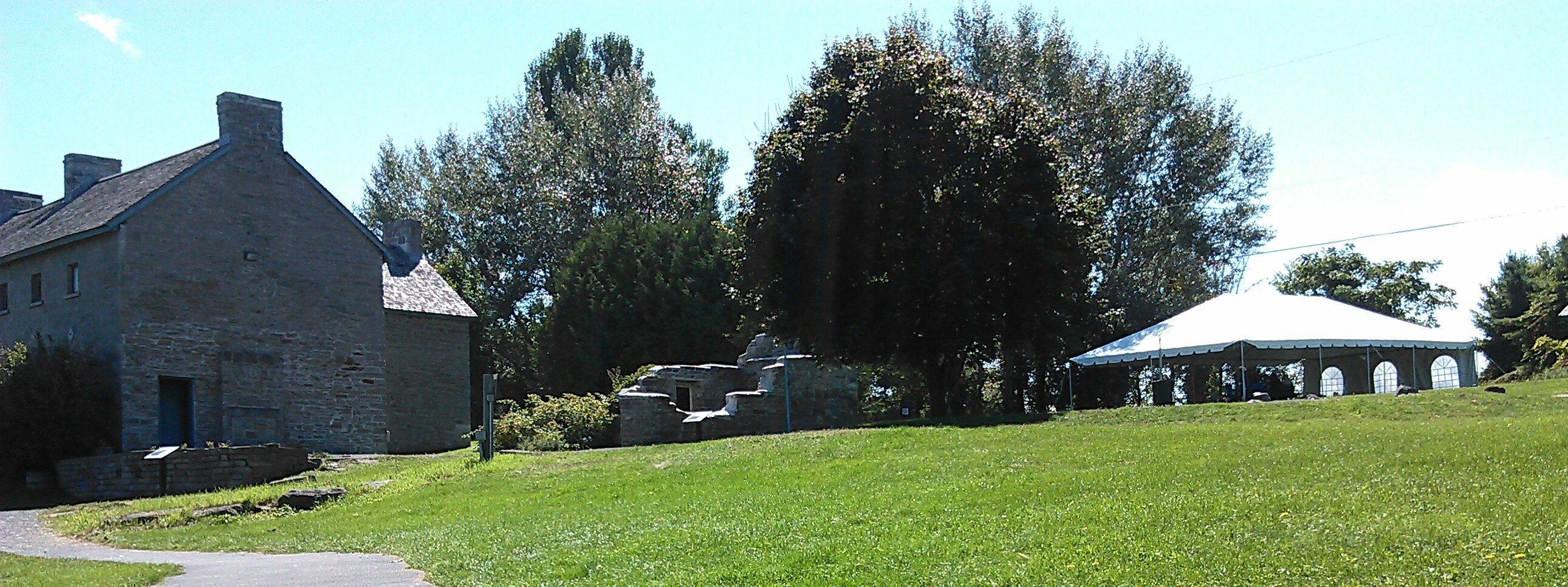
Horaceville and the Stone House

Pinhey established himself as a gentleman farmer on his land and named this location Horaceville after his eldest son. Though he began building with the log house, Pinhey had always intended to build a large stone house on top of the hill, overlooking his land. The first part of the stone house was completed in 1825, and consisted of a large Parlour for entertaining and the servants quarters on the second floor. The second part of the house was not completed until 1841, and included the Grand Entrance, the original Dining Room, the Master Bedroom and a second stone kitchen for Mrs. Pinhey. By this point Horace Pinhey had married and moved into the log house with his wife. The last part of the stone house was completed in 1848, and housed Hamnett's Library, the Drawing Room, several bedrooms for the family and Hamnett's Sanctum Sanctorum (the Holiest of Holies, a second floor indoor privy.) Though the house was built in three different stages, it was designed as a whole in a symmetrical Georgian fashion.

In addition to the house, Pinhey built a grist mill, sawmill, and St. Mary's Church on the site. Although the first service in the church was held on 7 October 1827, it was not consecrated until 1834 due to a dispute about the church's location with the ruling bishop at the time.

=== Aristocratic values ===
The Pinhey family continued their British aristocratic values at Horraceville. Other former members of the British military moved into March Township, and the group has been described as "Ottawa's original aristocracy." Pinhey was recognized as the leader of this group, and Horaceville served as its chief community. Pinhey welcomed members of the British elite into his home, including Lord Dalhousie and Upper Canada Anglican Bishop John Strachan. Pinhey also managed a full staff at his home including footmen and a butler. Pinhey's wife insisted on being carried to their family chapel in a sedan chair.

== Political life ==
In 1832, Pinhey was elected to the Legislative Assembly of Upper Canada in a by-election in Carleton County. He lost his seat the following year due to voting irregularities in the by-election. Pinhey continued to serve in various positions in local government and, in 1847, became a member of the Legislative Council of the Province of Canada. Pinhey had been governor of Christ's Hospital in London and continued to provide it with financial support.

== Death and successors ==
Hamnett Kirkes Pinhey died in 1857 and was buried in the graveyard at St. Mary's Church. The estate was left to his son, Horace Pinhey.

Members of the Pinhey family lived in the house until 1971. The last member of the family to live in the house was Ruth Pinhey. While she was living in the house, most rooms had been closed off save the old dining room, which she used as a bedroom, and the Grand Entrance, which she used as a living room. Upon her death in 1971, Ruth Pinhey left the estate to a family member, who then sold the property to the township of March.

The former site of the town of Horaceville has been preserved as the Pinhey's Point Historic Site operated by the City of Ottawa and the Pinhey's Point Foundation.

== Children and Descendants ==
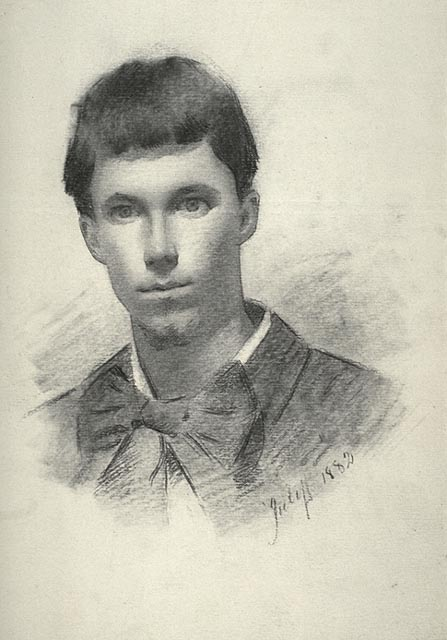
John Charles Pinhey (1860-1912) Self-portrait 1882

Children of Hamnett Kirkes Pinhey and Mary Ann Tasker

Hamnett Pinhey (1815-1815), Horace Pinhey (1817–1875), Constance Pinhey (1819–1898), Mary Anne Pinhey (1821–1896, Charles Hamnett Pinhey (1828–1893)

Children of Horace Pinhey and Catherine (Kate) Tydd Greene

Mary Anne Eliza Pinhey (1848–1929), Constance Anna Pinhey (1849–1932), Arabella Lucy Pinhey (1851–1905), Hamnett Kirkes Pinhey (1853–1941), Horace Pinhey (1857–1921), Kate Pinhey (1861–1937), Godfrey Greene Pinhey (1859–1910), Charles Townley Pinhey (1863–1879)

Children of Constance Pinhey and John Hamnett Pinhey John Charles Pinhey (1860–1912)

Children of Mary Anne Pinhey and Hamnett Hill (MD)

Hamnett Pinhey Hill (1845–1879), Mary Anne Lucy Hill (1847-1847), Charles Townley Hill (1850–1852), Emily Hill (1959-1945), Caroline Hill (1864–1945)

Children of Charles Hamnett Pinhey and Catherine Lewis

Mary Anne Pinhey (1863–1864), Harold Kirkes Pinhey (1865–1942), Charles Herbert Pinhey (1867–1955), Catherine Lucy Pinhey (1868–1954), Anna Hilda Pinhey (1870–1962)
