= Joseph M. Tucci =

American businessman (born 1947)

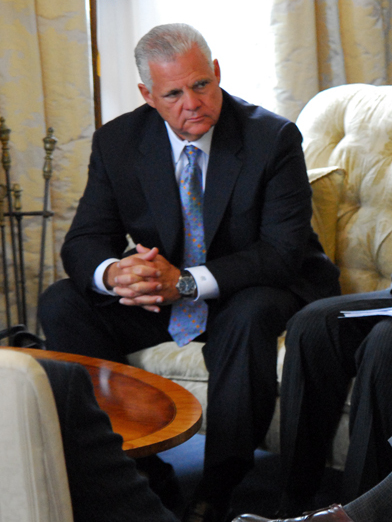
- Tucci in 2007
- Born: 1947 (age 78–79); Brooklyn, New York
- Education: Manhattan College; Columbia University (MS)
- Known for: former Chairman, president, and CEO of EMC Corporation

Joseph M. Tucci (born 1947 in Brooklyn, New York), more popularly known as Joe Tucci, is an American businessman. He is the former chairman, president and chief executive officer of EMC Corporation.

== Early life and education ==
Tucci received a bachelor's degree in marketing from Manhattan College in 1969 and an MS from Columbia University.

== Career ==
Before joining EMC, Tucci served as the chairman and chief executive officer of Wang Laboratories, leading the company out of Chapter 11 bankruptcy. The company was ultimately acquired by Getronics in 1999. Tucci is also a member of the President's Council of Advisors on Science and Technology (PCAST) under George W. Bush.

Tucci was EMC's chairman since January 2006 and president and CEO since January 2001, one year after he joined the company as president and chief operating officer. While CEO of EMC, Tucci was known as an unflinching proponent of using noncompete agreements to stifle competitors. When Dell acquired EMC in 2016, Tucci stepped down from his position at the company.

Since 2017, Tucci has served as the chair of Bridge Growth Partners.

== Compensation ==
While CEO of EMC in 2011, Joseph M. Tucci earned a total compensation of $13,238,857, which included a base salary of $1 million, a cash bonus of $2.1 million, and roughly $10 million in stocks and options.
