= William Teron =

Canadian businessman (1932–2018)

- Born: November 15, 1932; Gardenton, Manitoba, Canada
- Died: March 12, 2018 (aged 85)
- Occupation: Real estate executive
- Awards: Order of Canada

William Teron, OC (November 15, 1932 – March 12, 2018) was a Canadian real estate executive who was known as the "Father of Kanata".

Born in Gardenton, Manitoba, he moved to Ottawa when he was eighteen. He started his own company, Golden Ridge Developments Ltd. He is responsible for two suburban developments in the Ottawa area - the development of the former hamlet of Bells Corners, Ontario into a garden suburb (through the development of housing estates called Lynwood Park and Arbeatha Park in the early 1960s) - and the development of Beaverbrook, the beginning of the city of Kanata (later amalgamated into greater Ottawa) from a greenfield site in the Township of March, west of the Ottawa Greenbelt.

From 1973 to 1979, he was the chairman and President of Canada Mortgage and Housing Corporation (CMHC). In 1976, Teron served as Deputy Minister of the Ministry of State for Urban Affairs. He is the founder of Teron International Building Technologies.

In 1982, he was made an Officer of the Order of Canada. In 1978, he was made an honorary Fellow of the Royal Architectural Institute of Canada. He is also the recipient of the Silver, Gold and Diamond Queen's Jubilees medals and received the Jane Jacobs Lifetime Achievement Award in 2013.

Teron died on March 12, 2018, at the age of 85.
