= Horaceville, Ottawa =

Historic site in Ontario, Canada

Coordinates: 45°26′20″N 75°57′10″W

Horaceville Pinhey's Point Historic Site
- Interactive map of Horaceville; Pinhey's Point Historic Site
- Location: 270 Pinhey's Point Road; Dunrobin ON K0A 1T0

Site notes
- Area: 88 acres (36 ha)
- Governing body: Pinhey's Point Foundation
- Owner: City of Ottawa

Ontario Heritage Act

Horaceville is an historic site located on the Ottawa River in eastern Ontario, Canada. The site remained the property of the heirs of Hamnett Kirkes Pinhey until the 1970s, when the property was sold to the township. Today, the 88-acre (360,000 m^{2}) heritage site is owned and operated by the City of Ottawa and Pinhey's home serves as a museum. The museum is open May 14 through August 31, Wednesdays to Sundays, 11 AM to 5 PM. This location is also known as Pinhey's Point Historic Site.

The property was designated by the City of Ottawa under Part IV of the Ontario Heritage Act as having cultural heritage value or interest. A bronze plaque erected on the site by the Ontario Heritage Foundation describes the property's history: "Hamnet Kirkes Pinhey 1784 - 1857 - A merchant and ship owner in his native England, Pinhey came to Upper Canada in 1820. For his services as King's messenger during the Napoleonic Wars, he received a 1,000 acres (400 ha) land grant on the Ottawa River. Within a decade he had built up an estate which he named Horaceville after his elder son. In addition to a manor house and barns, it included mills, a store and church. Pinhey took a leading part in township and district affairs. He was appointed to the Legislative Council in 1847, served as Warden of the Dalhousie District, and as the first Warden of Carleton County. Horaceville remained in family hands until 1959 when it was purchased by the National Capital Commission."

The site, which is a popular destination for boaters, cyclists, and picnics, consists of 88 acres (360,000 m^{2}) of park land, an early 1800s stone manor house, two barns, scenic views of the Ottawa River, and several stone ruins. The manor house acts as an historic house museum with furnished rooms and temporary exhibits. The City of Ottawa offers multiple programs for families throughout its operating season (May–August) as well as some programs in the off-season. The park itself is open year-round. Admission to the museum is by donation; some of the programs and special events charge a small fee for participation. The venue can be rented for weddings, anniversaries, or any other special celebration.

== History ==
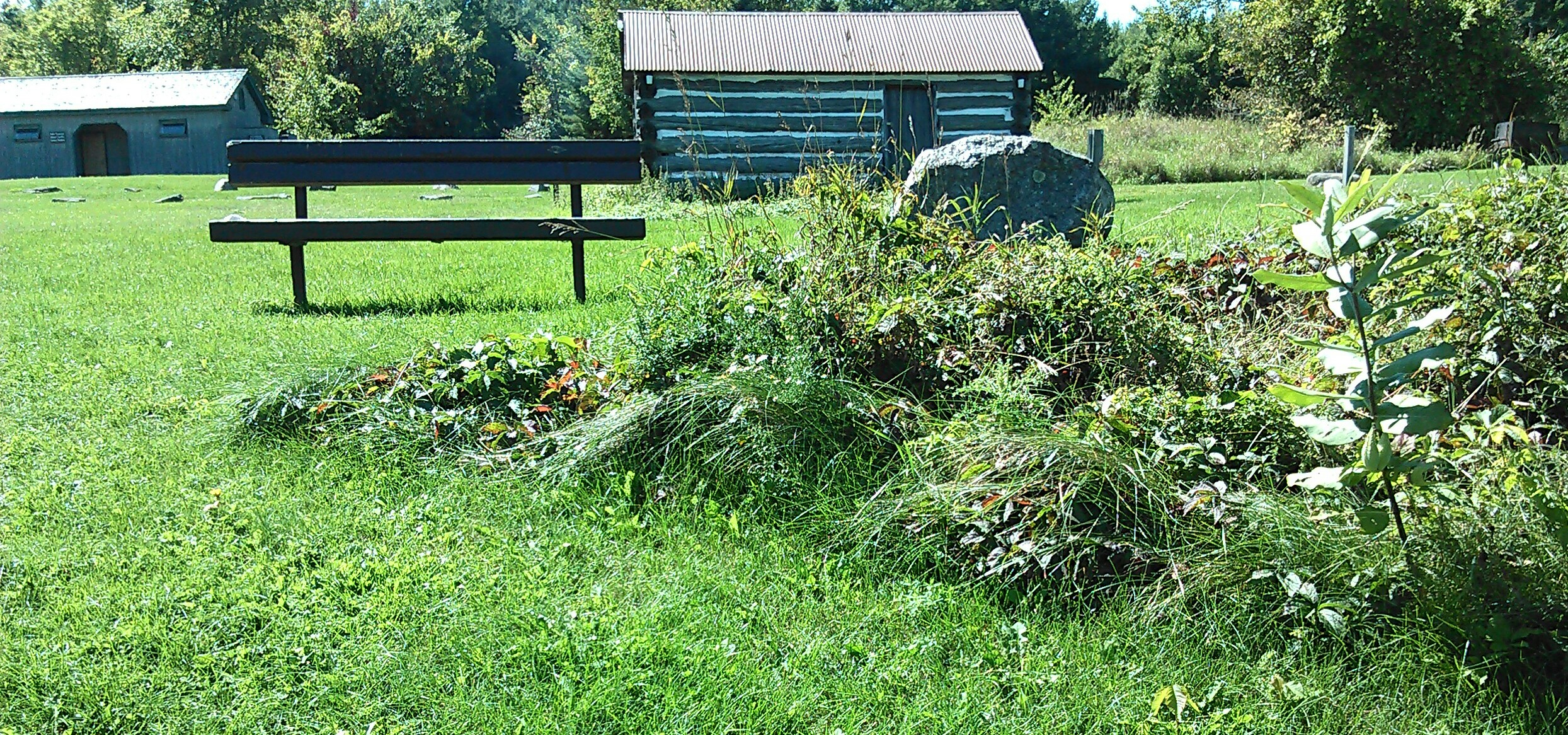
View of an early Pinhey family homestead outbuilding in March Township, built in 1825

Hamnett Kirkes Pinhey, an English merchant, petitioned Lord Bathurst, Colonial Secretary at the time, for land in Canada as reward for his service in the British Army and received a 1000-acre (4 km^{2}) land grant for service in the Napoleonic Wars. He retired from business, left England and travelled to Upper Canada around 1820.

On his lands in March Township, a settlement once divided between military gentlemen along the shore and Irish immigrants farther inland, he built a gristmill, homes for employees. On the hill overlooking the sheltered harbor of Pinhey's Point, he built a small two-storey log house covered in clapboard. There were seven small cannons facing the river. Pinhey, who continued to prosper as a politician and insurance broker, named the estate, Horaceville, after his oldest son Horace. Horace was to be the heir to the estate, in accordance with British aristocratic tradition.

The Horaceville estate, which consisted of several stone and log structures, is now known as Pinhey's Point Historic Site. The site includes 88 acres of farmers’ fields, shoreline, and parkland, the manor house, and several ruins.

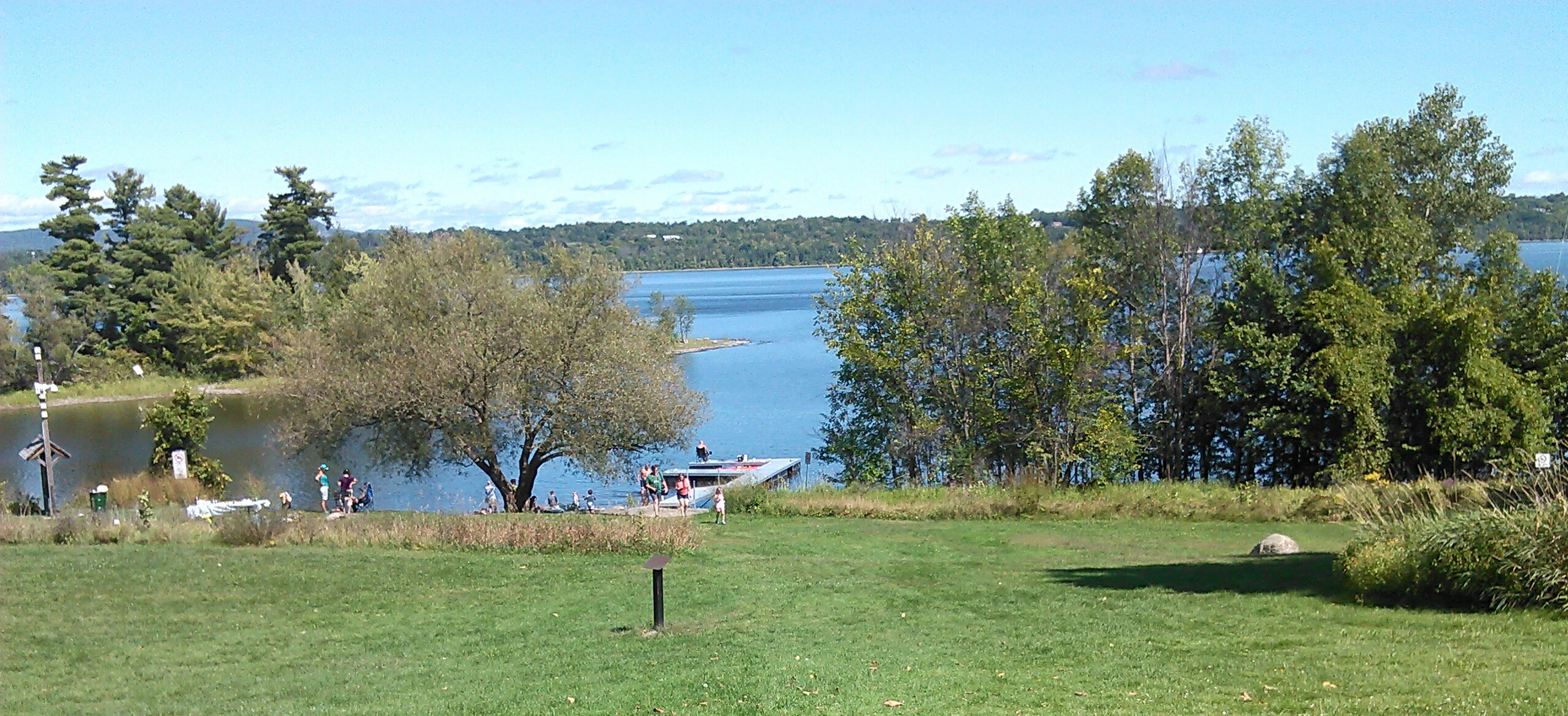
View of dock on Ottawa River of early Pinhey family homestead in March Township

Pinhey built a large stone manor house on top of the hill in three different stages, in a symmetrical Georgian fashion. The stone house, which was completed 1822–1825, consisted of a large parlour and three small bedrooms (servants quarters) on the second floor. An addition, completed in 1841, consisted of the Grand Entrance with a staircase leading upstairs, the original dining room, the master bedroom over the front entrance and a second central hall kitchen wing for Mrs. Pinhey. By 1941, Horace Pinhey and his wife had moved into the log house with his wife. A south wing addition, completed in 1848–1849, consisted of Hamnett's Library, the pantry, the drawing room, several family bedrooms and a second floor indoor privy. A placard interprets the unusual second-floor privy, as Hamnett's Sanctum Sanctorum (the Holiest of Holies). Although a stone facade was applied to the front of Horaceville, where it faced the Ottawa River, faux finishes were applied on the less visible walls. To give the appearance of more expensive woods, painted grain patterns were applied to plain pine floors and doors.

In addition to the house, Pinhey built a gristmill, sawmill, and St. Mary's Church on the site. Although the first service in the church was held on October 7, 1827, it was not consecrated until 1834 due to a dispute about the church's location with the ruling bishop at the time.

There are three historic buildings: Horaceville (house), the barn and the turkey barn. Other buildings on the site included a stone stable, powder magazine and St. Mary's Church. The construction of the church began on 1825 and the first service was held on October 7, 1827. The opening featured a seven gun salute from the cannons. The building of the church on this site was opposed by the bishop of Quebec, who felt that the church should be built further inland. Even though Pinhey donated part of his land and the labour costs, the bishop still refused to consecrate the church.

The site remained the property of Pinhey's heirs until Miss Ruth Pinhey died in 1971; her heirs sold the estate to March Townships. The Pinhey's Point Foundation was established in 1980 to preserve and develop the estate as a historic site and recreation area.

== Artifacts and exhibitions ==
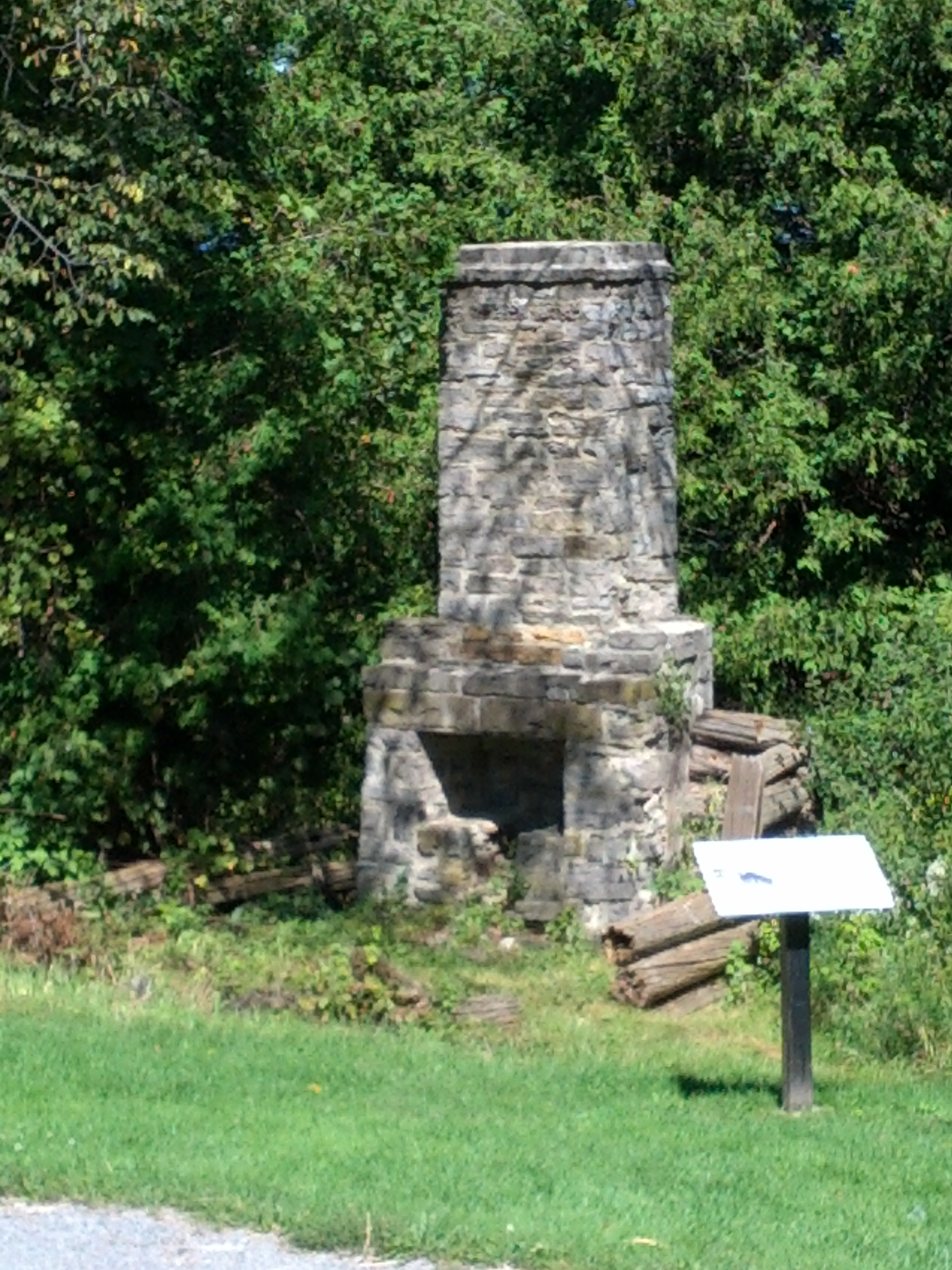
Ruin of Fireplace Pinhey Homestead erected 1825

The City of Ottawa and the Pinhey's Point Foundation interprets the history of the estate, The Pinhey family and Township of March/City of Kanata. The Pinhey's Point Foundation owned, managed and maintained the property from 1983 to 1990, when it was conveyed to the City of Kanata. Since Kanata amalgamated in 2001, the City of Ottawa has owned, managed and maintained the site and has been responsible for the special events, programs, and daily interpretation.

The Pinhey's Point Foundation owns the artifact collection and indoor exhibitions at Pinhey's Point, which provide historical context. Posters in the upstairs dining room, for example detail the restoration process the manor house underwent in 1990s, under architect Julian Smith. Julian Smith opted for the path of minimal intervention, since the deteriorating home of the twentieth century Pinheys is shown in the context of Hamnett Pinhey's mansion. In the attached stone kitchen Julian Smith removed twentieth-century remodeling to reveal the original hearth. In the kitchen, an antique drop leaf dining table is now covered in canvas. He chose not to repair the walls and ceiling, leaving the structural underpinnings exposed in several places. The Hamnett Pinhey's library remains furnished in its later incarnation as a sitting room/dining room complete with a reproduction 1880s gown. Although one wall retains the remnants of original wallpaper, the other three were painted green.

Some rooms contain period artifacts and depict the space's use. A trellis in the master bedroom, for example, describes Pinhey's gardens. In the parlour, panels describe Hamnett Pinhey and the house's construction. Others rooms function as exhibit space for rotating displays. "Whose Astrolabe?", for example, examined the origins of a seventeenth-century astrolabe, in the context of cultural ownership and contested memory.

In 2014, special events presented by the City of Ottawa included: Preschool Picnics at the Museum; Young Artisans; Explorer's Club; Horaceville Harvest; Culture Days; Ghost Stories of the Ottawa Valley; and Halloween at Horaceville. The City of Ottawa organizes and staff events at the museum where "visitors of all ages can learn about the area’s natural heritage, traditional trades, and the rich human history of the area."

== Boating ==
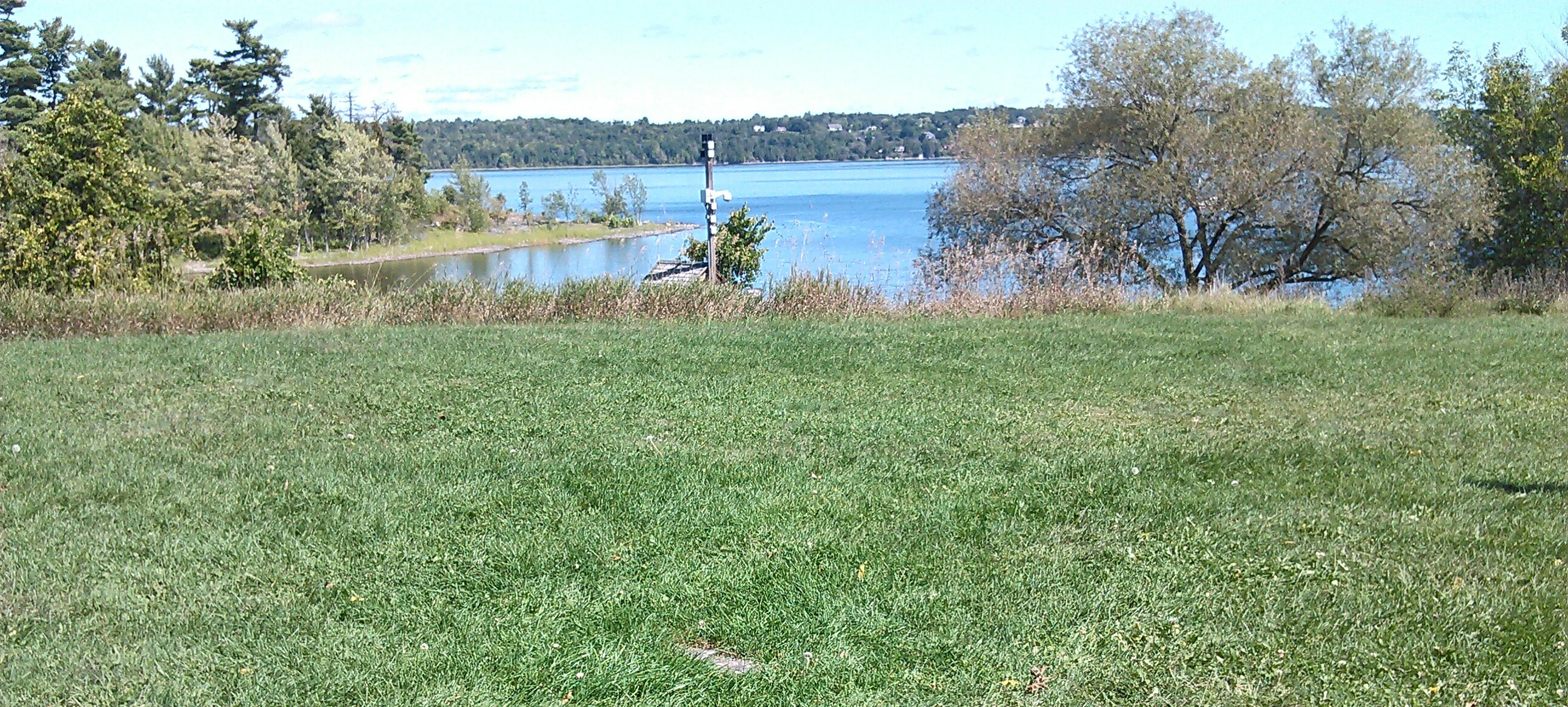
View of dock on Ottawa River of early Pinhey family homestead in March Township

The Pinhey's Point Historic Site hosts Riverfest on the last weekend of August celebrating the Ottawa's heritage and the Ottawa River through heritage games, demonstrations and live music. Cruising and day sailing events, distance race or regatta can be observed almost every weekend. Although Pinhey Point has a bay which is popular and convenient for both day and overnight anchorage, people should not attempt to land at the site's small dock facilities in anything bigger than a dinghy or tender. Many racing events are held in cooperation with the nearby Britannia Yacht Club, Nepean Sailing Club and Club de Voile Grande-Rivière.

Pinhey's Point Race & Raft-up is an Interclub Long Distance (~15 Nm) up-river race with a social raft-up at Pinhey's Point Historic Site, which held annually in late June or early July.

Month	Event	Host	Awards
June	Pinhey's Point Race -Interclub Long Distance (ILD) Race	Britannia Yacht Club Nepean Sailing Club	BYC Fleet Trophy, Edwin L. Brittain Trophy, Vice Commodore's Trophy, L.S. Sherwood Tray, Forrest Tray, Evening Citizen Trophy, Director's Trophy, Keepers

== Curriculum ==
For students from kindergarten through 7th grade, curriculum-linked programs are offered on topics related to history, social science, science, math, the arts, and physical education.

== Legacy ==
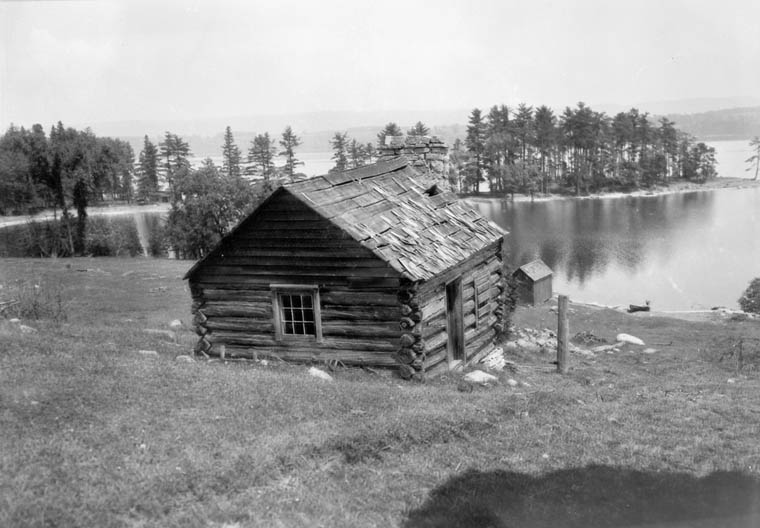
View of an early Pinhey family homestead in March Township, built in 1825 with the Ottawa River in the background.

The Ontario Heritage Trust erected a plaque for Honourable Hamnet Kirks Pinhey 1784–1857 at Horaceville, Pinhey's former estate beside the Ottawa River, Regional Road 21 north of Road 49, near South March - about 20 km from downtown Ottawa. "On land granted to him for service in the Napoleonic Wars, Pinhey built a substantial estate comprising several log and stone structures. Later, he became prominent in local affairs and held a number of public offices."

== See also ==
- List of designated heritage properties in Ottawa
- Hamnett Kirkes Pinhey
- March Township, Ontario
