= Solace Corporation =

Networking company

Solace
- Company type: Private
- Industry: Computer Hardware and Software
- Founded: 2001
- Headquarters: Kanata, Ontario
- Key people: Denis King, President & CEO; Craig Betts, Founder and Chairman
- Website: www.solace.com

Solace (formerly Solace Systems) is a middleware company based in Kanata / Ottawa, Ontario, Canada, that manufactures and sells message-oriented middleware appliances and software that routes information between applications, devices and user interfaces.

Solace was founded in 2001 by Craig Betts, with the idea of embedding messaging functionality in hardware. Between then and 2016, the company raised more than $60 million from venture capital firms. In 2016, New York equity firm Bridge Growth Partners acquired a majority stake in Solace with an investment of more than $100 million. In 2017, former Halogen Software CEO Les Rechan was hired as CEO of Solace, with Betts serving as the company’s executive chairman. In 2020, Denis King, the company's COO, was appointed as CEO of Solace, replacing Les Rechan.
