= Marshes Golf Club =

Public golf club located in Ottawa, Ontario

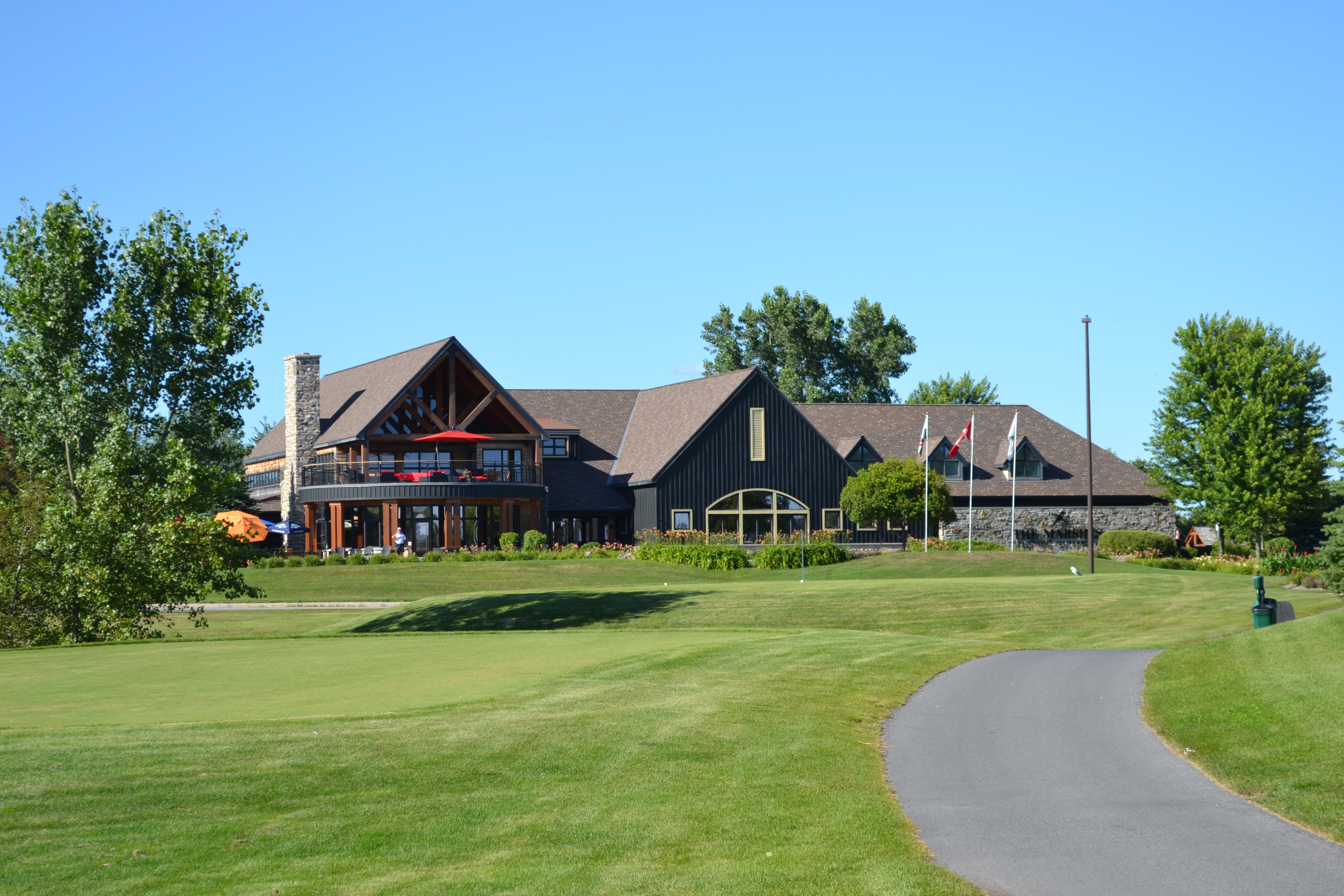
- Marshes Clubhouse from the 7th tee

- Location within Ottawa
- 45°21′09″N 75°54′43″W

Club information
- Location: 320 Terry Fox Drive, Ottawa, Ontario, Canada K2K 3L1
- Established: 2001
- Type: Public
- Owner: Wesley Clover
- Tournaments: Canadian PGA Seniors’ Championship
- Website: www.marshesgolfclub.com/index.php

The Marshes
- Designed by: Robert Trent Jones and Robert Trent Jones, Jr.
- Par: 72
- Length: 7,026 yards

The Marchwood
- Designed by: Raymond Jones
- Par: 27
- Length: 1,252 yards

The Marshes Golf Club is a public golf club located in Ottawa, Ontario. The Marshes golf course was designed by Robert Trent Jones II.

== Courses ==
- The Marshes – opened in June 2002. An 18-hole, par-72 championship course.
- The Marchwood – A 9-hole, par-27 short course.
- Blackbird Falls Putting Course – An 18-hole, par-42 putting course

== Tournaments ==
The Marshes Golf Club hosted the Canadian PGA Seniors’ Championship from 2005 to 2009. The Marshes Golf Club hosted the 2015 World Junior Girls Championship. It also hosts local and provincial amateur championships.

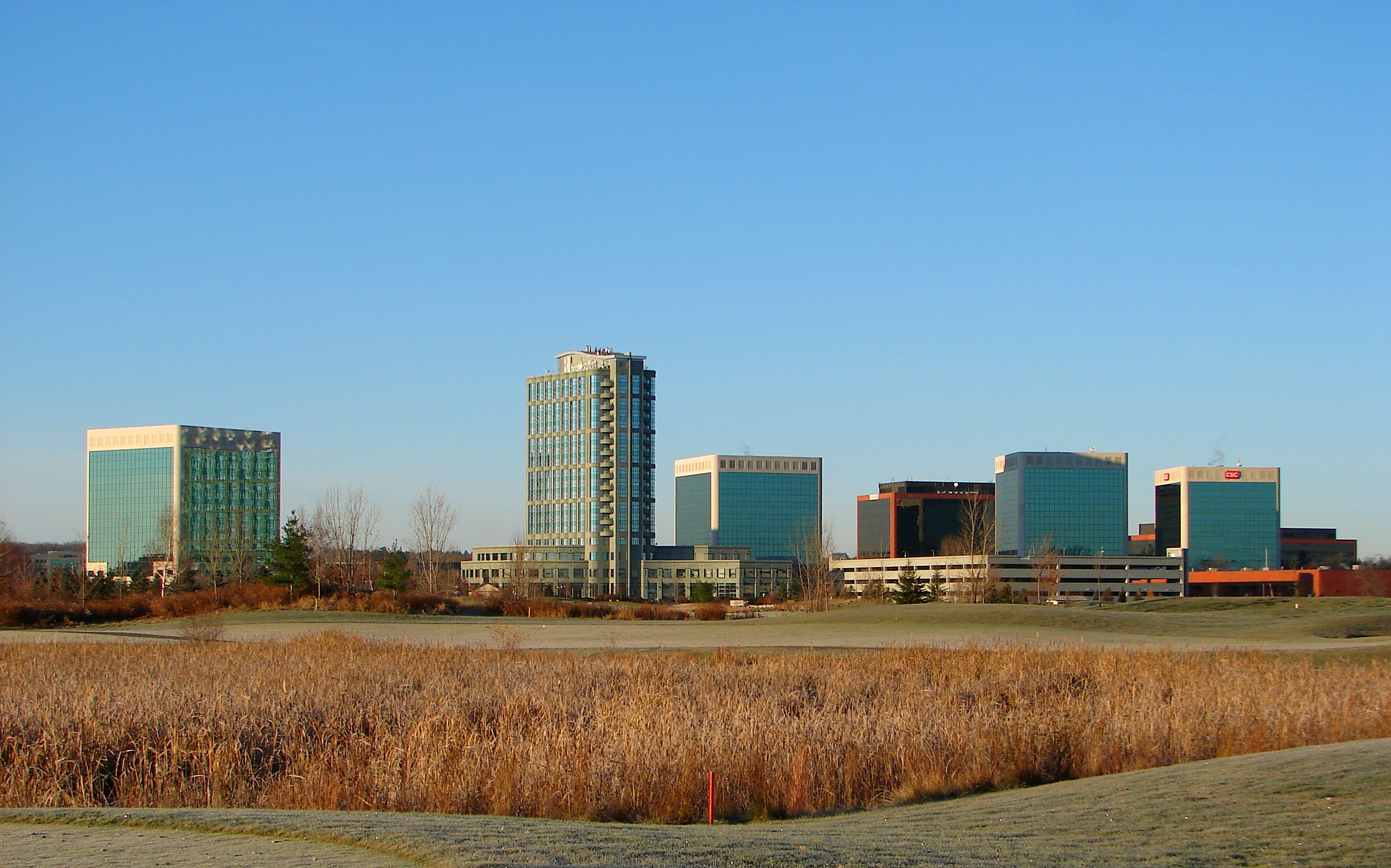
Marshes Golf Club with Kanata Research Park in background

== See also ==
- List of golf courses in Canada
