= Bridgewater Systems =

- Type: Public
- Industry: Telecommunications
- Founded: 1997
- Defunct: 2011
- Fate: Acquired by Amdocs
- Headquarters: Ottawa, Ontario, Canada
- Area served: Worldwide
- Revenue: approx. $93.4 million (FY2010)
- Number of employees: 300+(2011)
- Website: www.bridgewatersystems.com

Bridgewater Systems was a Canadian network management technology firm. It developed software for phone and cable companies. The firm was acquired by Amdocs in 2011.

== History ==
Bridgewater was founded by Doug Somers and Russ Freen in 1997. From 2004 to 2007, Bridgewater's revenues grew from $13.7 million to $39 million. In 2007 Bridgewater made an initial public offering on the Toronto Stock Exchange under the stock symbol BWC, where it raised $35 million. In 2008 Bridgewater expanded its long-time relationship with Verizon Wireless by signing a three-year contract which included an initial order valued at $30 million. In April 2011 Infonetics Research report ranked Bridgewater as #1 in the 2009 policy market In 2011, Bridgewater's board unanimously approved a takeover bid from Amdocs, an American headquarter technology firm, valuing the company at $215 million.
