= Morgan's Grant =

- Neighbourhood
- Interactive map of Morgan's Grant
- Country: Canada
- Province: Ontario
- City: Ottawa

Government
  - City Councillor: Cathy Curry
- Time zone: UTC−5 (Eastern (EST))
  - Summer (DST): UTC−4 (EDT)

Morgan's Grant is a suburban neighbourhood located in Kanata, Ottawa, Ontario, Canada. It is north of the Kanata North Business Park, west of March Road, and north of Terry Fox Drive. As of the 2016 Canada Census, its population was 9,825.

Morgan's Grant has several recreational pathways, a number of playgrounds, a public elementary school, a French public elementary school, and a variety of services.

Along with the neighbourhoods of Brookside and Briarbrook, Morgan's Grant is part of the Briarbrook Brookside Morgan's Grant Community Association.

== History ==
The modern Morgan's Grant was originally part of the Township of March, and was first settled by Europeans in the early nineteenth century, many buildings from the 1800s still exist and are active to this day, such as "806 March Road" and "160 Flamborough Way", 160 Flamborough Way was actually a Loyal Orange Lodge, number 338, during the 1800s where farmers would meet up, and the St Isidore Church was also a part of Township of March in the 1800s. Development of the area began in the late 1980s and more construction of schools and houses during 2000–2009 with homes around the main streets of Morgan's Grant Way, Allenby Road, Ipswich Terrace, Halton Terrace and Flamborough Way, Mersey Drive, leading up to Terry Fox Drive and Monk Environmental Park. Starting in the mid to late 1990s, expansion began by Minto Developments to the north and has since reached up to Old Carp Road.

== Schools ==
- Jack Donohue Public School
- Ecole Elementaire Publique Julie-Payette (Ottawa)
- Morgan's Grant Montessori School (Kanata / Ottawa)
- South March Public School (Brookside)

== Notable residents ==
- Zack Smith - hockey player
- Erik Karlsson - hockey player
