= Salient CRGT =

GovCIO (formerly Salient CRGT)
- Company type: Private
- Industry: IT and defense
- Predecessor: Salient Federal Solutions & CRGT, Inc.
- Founded: 2010; 16 years ago
- Headquarters: Fairfax, Virginia, United States
- Area served: Worldwide
- Key people: Jim Brabston (CEO)
- Number of employees: 2,600 (2022)
- Website: www.govcio.com

GovCIO, previously Salient CRGT, Inc, is an American private firm that provides health analytics, cloud services, Agile software development, mobility services, cyber security, data analytics, and infrastructure optimization to civilian, defense, homeland and intelligence agencies. In addition, it offers services in the areas of command and control, enterprise IT, enterprise mobility, legacy IT transformation, training, and user experience design; as well as a government wide acquisition program management office. The company serves federal civilian, state and local, DoD, national security, commercial, and international markets.

GovCIO is headquartered in Fairfax, Virginia, and has 22 offices with personnel in more than 270 global locations.

In 2017, as Salient CRGT, GovCIO purchased Springfield-based Information Innovators Inc. The acquisition propelled the company to more than half a billion dollars in yearly revenue.

Salient CRGT was acquired by GovernmentCIO LLC, now GovCIO, in August of 2021
