= Richardson Ridge =

Richardson Ridge is a cold water coral reef in the Atlantic Ocean about 160 miles off the coast of Charleston, South Carolina and a half mile below the ocean's surface. Based on sonar mapping, it is estimated that the reef extends for at least 85 linear miles.

== Discovery ==
The ridge was discovered in the summer of 2018 by a team led by Erik Cordes, a deep-sea ecologist and professor from Temple University.
