= DragonWave-X =

Multinational wireless technology company

- Trade name: DragonWave-X, Inc.
- Type: Subsidiary
- Industry: Wireless Backhaul
- Founded: Ottawa, Ontario (2000)
- Headquarters: Ottawa, Ontario, Canada
- Products: High-capacity packet microwave solutions
- Parent: Transform-X
- Website: www.dragonwavex.com

DragonWave-X (formerly just DragonWave) is a multinational corporation headquartered in Ottawa, Ontario and a global supplier of packet microwave radio systems for mobile and access IP networks.

== History ==
Incorporated in February 2000, DragonWave introduced its first wireless broadband product in 2002.

In 2007, the company saw the launch of its all-outdoor Horizon Compact microwave radio with transport speeds of 800 Mbit/s.

DragonWave was first listed on the Toronto Stock Exchange in 2007, and then listed on the NASDAQ exchange in 2009.

In 2011, DragonWave introduced two products, the Avenue and Horizon Compact+.

In October 2017, DragonWave was acquired by Transform-X, and was re-branded DragonWave-X.
