= Kanata Symphony =

The Kanata Symphony Orchestra is a non-profit community orchestra, in Ottawa, Ontario, Canada. Members are amateur musicians from all walks of life, from across the National Capital Region.

== Description ==
The Kanata Symphony Orchestra is a mid-size orchestra, and consists of all instruments typically found in a symphony orchestra: strings, percussion, woodwinds, and brass. The orchestra rehearses weekly from September until May.

Since 1981, the Kanata Symphony has aimed at bringing music to the public at affordable prices.

== Season ==
A typical season for the Kanata Symphony Orchestra includes three regularly programmed concerts (Fall, Winter, Spring) and often includes a Holiday concert in December.

In the past, The Kanata Symphony Orchestra provided an evening of pops entertainment for the Royal Canadian Legion Branch 638 annual Christmas dinner. The program may consist of marches, Johann Strauss II, French-Canadian classics, Leroy Anderson, and Christmas carols. The relationship between the Kanata Symphony Orchestra and the Canadian Legion was initiated by one of its early members, serving in both organizations.

A typical Kanata Symphony Orchestra may contain full classical Symphonies, concertos, or overtures. Often, the KSO will present a variety of repertoire forming an entertaining program for the entire family.

== Joining ==
Several times a year, the Kanata Symphony Orchestra hosts an open house, where new members are encouraged to attend. In the interest of maintaining a balance, the Kanata Symphony Orchestra may not be able to offer positions to all those interested in joining. However, violin players are typically sought after. No audition is required, with an understanding that the new member and the orchestra can come to an agreement on the suitability of placement.
