= March Township, Ontario =

Coordinates: 45°22.5′N 75°57.5′W

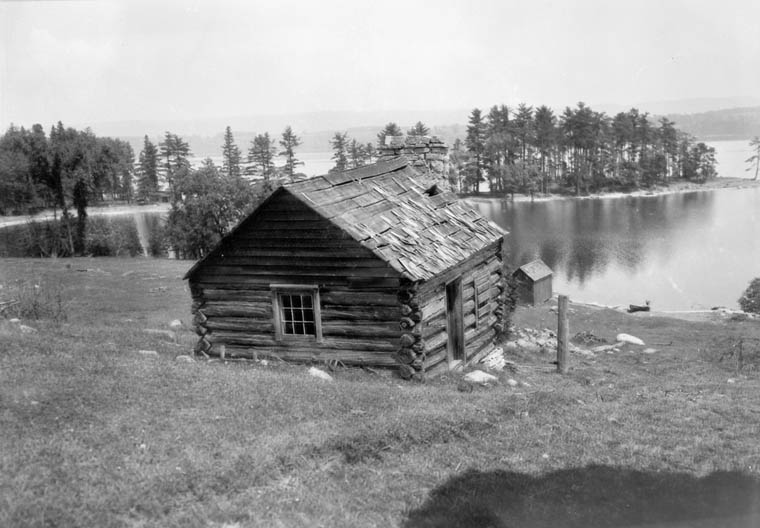
View of the Pinhey family homestead in March Township, built in 1825 with the Ottawa River in the background.

March Township is a geographic township and former municipality originally part of Carleton County in eastern Ontario, Canada. It is currently part of the City of Ottawa. It is located in the western part of the county, bordered to the northwest by Torbolton Township, to the southwest by Huntley Township, to the east by Nepean, to the south by Goulbourn Township and to the north by the Ottawa River. According to the Canada 2001 Census, the Township had a population of approximately 26,650.

== History ==
The township took its name from the subsidiary title of Charles Lennox, 4th Duke of Richmond, the Earl of March. The township was established in the 1820s. Early settlers in the area included Hamnett Kirkes Pinhey and Doctor Alexander James Christie.

Long before the Royal Military College of Canada was established in 1876, retired British navy and army officers who had settled in March township, proposed a military college boarding school for boys on the Great Lakes on naval and military lines in 1826.

By 1866, March was a post village with a population of about 100, situated in the township of March, and county of Carleton. The postmaster was T. Read. Citizens included W.H. Berry, brewer; George I McMurtry tanner, saddle and harness maker; William Boucher, saw mill proprietor; D Munroe, hotel keeper; Horace Pinhey, saw mill owner and D. McMurtry, general merchant.

In 1978, all of the township became part of the new city of Kanata. The village of Dunrobin, Ontario was also located in the township. In 2001, this area was amalgamated into the new city of Ottawa.

== Reeves ==
- 1850 Hamnett Kirkes Pinhey
- 1856 R.Y. Greene
- 1864 W.H. Berry
- 1868 R.Y. Greene
- 1871 William Richardson
- 1876 R.Y. Greene
- 1897 n/a
- 1907 S. Gilchrist
- 1909 O. Riddell
- 1910 S. Gilchrist
- 1911 O. Riddell
- 1912 Godfrey Armitrage
- 1913 A.H. Acres
- 1917 George Armstrong
- 1923 C.R. Irvine
- 1925 Godfrey Armitrage
- 1932 John M. Storey
- 1949 Claude V. Riddell
- 1960 Ernest McCord
- 1962 Charles Sweeney
- 1963 Harold N. Craig
- 1968 John Mlacak
- 1976 Marianne Wilkinson

== See also ==
- List of townships in Ontario
