= List of companies based in Ottawa =

This is an alphabetical list of companies that have at one-point or another been based in Ottawa:

- Abacus Data
- Alterna Savings
- Atkinson Film-Arts
- Bank of Ottawa
- Bell-Northern Research
- BreconRidge
- Bridgewater Systems
- Brookstreet Pictures
- Bruised Tongue
- Campeau Corporation
- Canada Deposit Insurance Corporation
- Canada Mortgage and Housing Corporation
- Canada Post
- Canadian Bank Note Company
- Canadian Broadcasting Corporation
- Canadian Commercial Corporation
- Ciel Satellite Group
- Cognos
- Corel
- CPAC (TV channel)
- CPCS Transcom
- Defence Construction Canada
- Doyle Salewski Inc
- DragonWave
- Ekos Research Associates
- ENCON Group Inc.
- Epiphan Systems
- Eurocom Corporation
- Export Development Canada
- Farm Boy
- First Air
- Freimans
- Fuel Industries
- Funbag Animation Studios
- Gabriel Pizza
- Gandalf Technologies
- Giant Tiger
- Giatec Scientific
- Halogen Software
- Hydro Ottawa
- Ingenia Communications Corporation
- International Development Research Centre
- Iogen Corporation
- Kelp Records
- Klipfolio
- Knight Enterprises
- Kongsberg Gallium Ltd.
- KRP Properties
- Lacewood Productions
- Lee Valley Tools
- Level Platforms
- Loeb (supermarket)
- Lumenera
- Magma Communications
- Market Fresh
- Marshes Golf Club
- MediaMiser
- Mercury Filmworks
- MicroSystems International
- Minto Group
- Mitel
- MKC Networks
- NABU Network
- Neptec Design Group
- Newbridge Networks
- Nordion
- Le Nordir
- Ogilvy's
- Ottawa Car Company
- Ottawa Central Railway
- PlaSmart
- Pleora
- Pronexus
- ProntoForms
- Protecode
- Protus
- Public Sector Pension Investment Board
- Pure Spring Company
- QNX Software Systems
- Quickie Convenience Stores
- Red Quill Books
- SAW Video Mediatheque
- Shopify
- Siemens Healthineers
- Signority
- Skycron
- Solace
- Solidum Systems
- Spiderwort
- Tablo (DVR)
- Telesat
- Ten Broadcasting
- Tundra Semiconductor
- Versaterm
- West Wholesale
- Wilderness Tours
- Zarlink
