= Comparison of survey software =

Software tools for surveys are varied, ranging from desktop applications to complex web systems for monitoring consumer behaviour. The tables includes general and technical information for notable Computer-assisted survey information collection (CASIC) software.

Product	Developer	Headquarters	First public release	Delivery method	License	As of
Formstack	Formstack, LLC	Indianapolis, Indiana, USA	2006	SaaS	Proprietary	As of December 12, 2011
Google Forms	Google, Inc.	Mountain View, California, USA	2008	SaaS	Proprietary	As of December 12, 2011
Jotform	Jotform, Inc.	San Francisco, California, USA	2006	SaaS	Proprietary	As of July 1, 2020
LimeSurvey	The LimeSurvey project team	Hamburg, Germany	2003	SaaS, On-premises	GNU GPL v2+	As of October 21, 2016
Microsoft Forms	Microsoft	Redmond, Washington	2016	SaaS	Proprietary	As of October 19, 2016
ODK	Get ODK Inc.	San Diego, California, USA	2008	SaaS, On-premises	Apache	As of July 1, 2022
Qualtrics	Qualtrics Labs, Inc.	Provo, Utah, USA	2005	SaaS	Proprietary	As of September 1, 2011
Satmetrix	Satmetrix Systems, Inc	San Mateo, California, USA		SaaS	Proprietary	As of March 23, 2019
SurveyLab	7 Points sp. z o.o.	Warsaw, Poland	2006	SaaS	Proprietary	As of December 21, 2025
SurveyMonkey	SurveyMonkey Inc.	San Mateo, California, USA	1999	SaaS	Proprietary	As of December 12, 2011
Survio	Survio	Brno, Czech Republic	2012	SaaS	Proprietary	As of November 3, 2016
Typeform	Robert Muñoz, David Okuniev	Barcelona, Spain	2012	SaaS	Proprietary	As of April 27, 2020
Zoho Survey	Zoho Corporation	Pleasanton, California, USA	2013	SaaS	Proprietary	As of February 4, 2015

== See also ==
- Comparison of statistical packages
- Computer-assisted qualitative data analysis software
