= Electronic paper (disambiguation) =

Electronic paper is a paper-like display technology.

It is also known as electronic ink (e-ink) or intelligent paper.

It may also mean:

- E ink, a brand of electronic paper
- Intelligent form, a type of electronic form
- Digital ink, the digital capture of hand writing
- Digital paper, patterned paper used with a digital pen
- Online newspaper
