= Intelligent form =

User interface technique

An intelligent form is a form built around dynamic, interactive behaviours intended to help users make sense of what's being asked, fill things in correctly, and submit without frustration. The concept is largely native to digital environments, where the gap between a well-designed form and a poorly designed one can be the difference between a completed submission and an abandoned one. Traditional forms are static: they present fields and wait. Intelligent forms do something more; they respond. Whether through a programmer's logic or a user interface designer's decisions, these forms adapt to what users are doing and try to smooth over the places where things typically go wrong.

== Features ==
The capabilities that define intelligent forms vary in sophistication, but a few patterns show up consistently:

Real-time validation catches problems as they happen (a malformed email address, a missing required field) rather than throwing a wall of errors at the end. Conditional logic lets the form change shape depending on what a user has already said. Fields appear, disappear, or transform based on prior answers. Contextual help surfaces the right instruction at the right moment: tooltips, inline hints, or examples that don't clutter the interface until they're needed. Auto-completion draws on past input or external data to reduce how much a user has to type from scratch. Adaptive interfaces go further still, adjusting layout or content to match the user's device, behaviour, or apparent preferences. Artificial intelligence integration, through natural language processing, machine learning, or related techniques, can interpret ambiguous input, suggest answers, or handle form-filling with minimal human effort.

Taken together, these features are meant to lower cognitive load and cut down on the kind of friction that drives users away before they finish.

== Applications ==
Intelligent forms have found their way into most areas where structured data collection matters: online registration and onboarding flows, e-commerce checkout, customer relationship management (CRM) systems, surveys, and public-sector or e-government services, among others.

== Examples ==
A number of platforms have built their offerings around these capabilities, each with a different emphasis:

Google Forms handles basic validation and conditional logic, suited to straightforward use cases. Typeform leans into a conversational format, presenting questions one at a time to feel less like a form and more like a dialogue. Jotform covers more complex territory: advanced branching logic, third-party integrations, and automation. Microsoft Forms sits inside the Microsoft ecosystem, with real-time feedback and native integration across its services. Airtable blurs the line between form and database, connecting input directly to workflow automation. Lator focuses specifically on AI-enhanced forms and the automation layer behind them.

== See also ==
Form (HTML) User interface design Human–computer interaction Data validation
