= 2020 United States presidential election in New Jersey =

- November 3, 2020
- Turnout: 72.35% (▲4.22%)

Nominee	Joe Biden	Donald Trump
Party	Democratic	Republican
Home state	Delaware	Florida
Running mate	Kamala Harris	Mike Pence
Electoral vote	14	0
Popular vote	2,608,400	1,883,313
Percentage	57.33%	41.40%

Biden
40–50%
50–60%
60–70%
70–80%
80–90%
90–100%
Trump
40–50%
50–60%
60–70%
70–80%
80–90%
90–100%
Tie/No Data
President before election
Donald Trump
Republican
Elected President
Joe Biden
Democratic

The 2020 United States presidential election in New Jersey was held on Tuesday, November 3, 2020, as part of the 2020 United States presidential election in which all 50 states plus the District of Columbia participated. New Jersey voters chose electors to represent them in the Electoral College via a popular vote, pitting the Republican Party's nominee, incumbent President Donald Trump, and running mate Vice President Mike Pence against Democratic Party nominee, former Vice President Joe Biden, and his running mate California Senator Kamala Harris. New Jersey has 14 electoral votes in the Electoral College.

Prior to the election, New Jersey was considered to be a state Biden would easily win or a safe blue state. Biden carried New Jersey by 15.94%, making the state 11.48% more Democratic than the nation as a whole. Per exit polls by the Associated Press, Biden's victory came from a coalition of key Democratic constituencies, including 86% of Blacks, 76% of Asians, 72% of Hispanic and Latino Americans, and 50% of Whites. Biden's strength with Asian Americans was evident in New Jersey, where Asians constituted 10.0% of the population in 2019.

Biden flipped Gloucester County, which was reliably Democratic until Trump flipped it in 2016. He also became the first Democrat since Lyndon B. Johnson in 1964 to win Morris County, which Cory Booker won in the simultaneous senate election. This also became the first presidential election since 2000 in which Salem County did not vote for the national winner. Trump carried 255 of New Jersey's 565 municipalities, fewer than the 307 he carried in 2016, with Biden carrying the other 310. Biden's 2.6 million votes is the most received by any candidate of either party in a presidential election in the state's history.

== Primary elections ==
The primary elections were originally scheduled for June 2, 2020. In April, they were moved to July 7 due to concerns over the COVID-19 pandemic. On May 15, 2020, Governor Phil Murphy signed an executive order declaring the primary election to become a primarily vote-by-mail election. Democratic and Republican voters will automatically receive a vote-by-mail ballot while unaffiliated and inactive voters will get a vote-by-mail application. Unaffiliated voters must declare their party in the application and send in to their respective county board of elections in order to vote and receive their primary election ballot. A limited number of polling stations in each county were available on primary day for those who prefer to vote in person (including with provisional ballots if they're unable to obtain one) and for voters with disabilities.

=== Republican primary ===
Incumbent President Donald Trump ran unopposed in the Republican primary. The state has 49 delegates to the 2020 Republican National Convention.

2020 New Jersey Republican primary
Candidate	Votes	%	Delegates
Donald Trump (incumbent)	457,212	100	49
Total	457,212	100.00	49

=== Democratic primary ===
2020 New Jersey Democratic presidential primary
Candidate	Votes	%	Delegates
Joe Biden	814,188	84.92	121
Bernie Sanders (withdrawn)	140,412	14.65	5
Uncommitted	4,162	0.43	
Total	958,762	100%	126

=== Green primary ===
New Jersey Green Party presidential primary, May 2, 2020
Candidate	Votes	Percentage (Note: This primary was conducted under a system in which each person could cast a vote for more than one candidate, therefore percentages reflect the percentage of voters that approved of each candidate, and as a result do not add up to 100%.)	National delegates
Howie Hawkins	44	78.6%	5
Dario Hunter	4	7.1%	0
Jesse Ventura	3	5.4%	0
Sedinam Moyowasifza-Curry	2	3.6%	0
Bernie Sanders	2	3.6%	0
Kent Mesplay	1	1.8%	0
Susan Buchser-Lochocki	0	0%	0
Dennis Lambert	0	0%	0
Chad Wilson	0	0%	0
David Rolde	0	0%	0
Total	56	100.00%	5

== General election ==
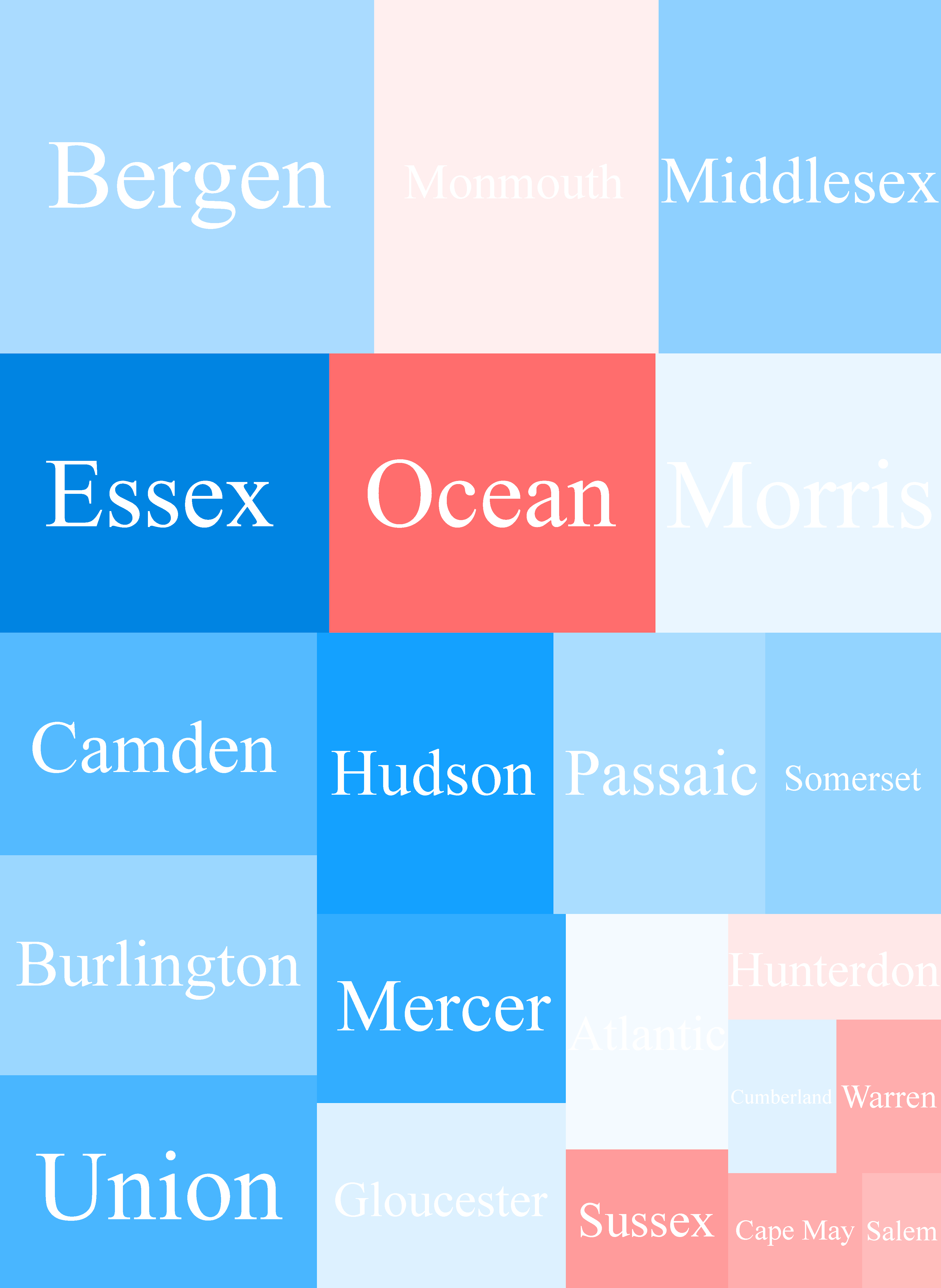
Cartogram the 2020 Presidential Election in New Jersey

=== Predictions ===
Source	Ranking	As of
The Cook Political Report	Solid D	October 28, 2020
Inside Elections	Safe D	October 16, 2020
Sabato's Crystal Ball	Safe D	October 8, 2020
Politico	Safe D	September 8, 2020
RCP	Likely D	August 3, 2020
Niskanen	Safe D	July 26, 2020
CNN	Safe D	August 3, 2020
The Economist	Safe D	September 2, 2020
CBS News	Likely D	September 27, 2020
270towin	Safe D	August 2, 2020
ABC News	Safe D	July 31, 2020
NPR	Likely D	October 30, 2020
NBC News	Likely D	August 6, 2020
538	Solid D	September 27, 2020
Fox News	Likely D	November 2, 2020

=== Polling ===
==== Graphical summary ====
View source data.

==== Aggregate polls ====
Source of poll aggregation	Dates administered	Dates updated	Joe Biden Democratic	Donald Trump Republican	Other/ Undecided (Note: Calculated by taking the difference of 100% and all other candidates combined.)	Margin
270 to Win	October 9 – November 2, 2020	November 3, 2020	56.5%	37.3%	6.2%	Biden +19.2
Real Clear Politics	September 4 – October 13, 2020	November 3, 2020	54.7%	37.3%	8.0%	Biden +17.4
FiveThirtyEight	until November 2, 2020	November 3, 2020	58.4%	37.9%	3.7%	Biden +20.4
Average			56.5%	37.5%	7.8%	Biden +19.0

Polls

Poll source	Date(s) administered	Sample size (Note: Key: A – all adults RV – registered voters LV – likely voters V – unclear)	Margin of error	Donald Trump Republican	Joe Biden Democratic	Jo Jorgensen Libertarian	Howie Hawkins Green	Other	Undecided
SurveyMonkey/Axios	Oct 20 – Nov 2, 2020	3,870 (LV)	± 2%	38% (Note: Overlapping sample with the previous SurveyMonkey/Axios poll, but more information available regarding sample size)	59%	-	-	–	–
Research Co.	Oct 31 – Nov 1, 2020	450 (LV)	± 4.6%	40%	59%	-	-	1% (Note: "Someone else" with 1%)	5%
Swayable	Oct 27 – Nov 1, 2020	324 (LV)	± 7.2%	40%	59%	1%	0%	–	–
SurveyMonkey/Axios	Oct 1–28, 2020	6,472 (LV)	–	37%	60%	-	-	–	–
Swayable	Oct 23–26, 2020	386 (LV)	± 6.5%	38%	62%	0%	0%	–	–
Rutgers-Eagleton	Oct 19–24, 2020	834 (LV)	± 4%	37%	59%	-	-	1% (Note: "Neither" with 1%; "Someone else" with 0%)	1%
Stockton College	Oct 7–13, 2020	721 (LV)	± 3.7%	36%	56%	-	-	–	–
DKC Analytics/Brach Eichler	Oct 5–13, 2020	500 (LV)	± 4.4%	34%	56%	-	-	10% (Note: "Another candidate or unsure" with 10%)	–
Fairleigh Dickinson University	Sep 30 – Oct 5, 2020	582 (LV)	± 4.6%	38%	53%	-	-	5% (Note: "Refused" with 4%; "Someone else" with 1%)	4%
SurveyMonkey/Axios	Sep 1–30, 2020	2,952 (LV)	–	37%	60%	-	-	–	3%
DKC Analytics/Brach Eichler	Sep 8–16, 2020	501 (LV)	± 4.4%	38%	52%	-	-	10%	–
Emerson College	Sep 4–7, 2020	500 (LV)	± 4.4%	40% (Note: With voters who lean towards a given candidate)	58%	-	-	2% (Note: "Someone else" with 2%)	–
SurveyMonkey/Axios	Aug 1–31, 2020	2,309 (LV)	–	40%	57%	-	-	–	3%
DKC Analytics/Brach Eichler	Aug 5–13, 2020	500 (LV)	± 4.383%	33%	52%	-	-	15% (Note: "Another candidate or unsure" with 15%)	–
SurveyMonkey/Axios	Jul 1–31, 2020	2,426 (LV)	–	37%	61%	-	-	–	2%
Pollfish/DKC Analytics/Brach Eichler	Jul 7–12, 2020	500 (LV)	± 4.383%	33%	51%	-	-	7% (Note: "For another candidate" with 7%)	8%
SurveyMonkey/Axios	Jun 8–30, 2020	1,110 (LV)	–	37%	61%	-	-	–	3%
Quinnipiac	Apr 30 – May 4, 2020	941 (RV)	± 3.2%	35%	54%	-	-	3% (Note: "Someone else" with 2%; would not vote with 1%)	8%
Rutgers-Eagleton	Apr 22 – May 2, 2020	689 (RV)	± 4.2%	33%	56%	-	-	5% (Note: "Neither" with 4%; "someone else" with 1%)	7%
Monmouth University	Apr 16–19, 2020	635 (RV)	± 3.9%	38%	54%	-	-	2%	6%
Fairleigh Dickinson University	Feb 12–16, 2020	715 (RV)	–	35%	53%	-	-	–	–

Former candidates

Donald Trump vs. Bernie Sanders

Poll source	Date(s) administered	Sample size	Margin of error	Donald Trump (R)	Bernie Sanders (D)	Other	Undecided
Fairleigh Dickinson University	Feb 12–16, 2020	715 (RV)	–	36%	53%	–	–

Donald Trump vs. Elizabeth Warren

Poll source	Date(s) administered	Sample size	Margin of error	Donald Trump (R)	Elizabeth Warren (D)	Other	Undecided
Fairleigh Dickinson University	Feb 12–16, 2020	715 (RV)	–	36%	50%	–	–

Donald Trump vs. Michael Bloomberg

Poll source	Date(s) administered	Sample size	Margin of error	Donald Trump (R)	Michael Bloomberg (D)	Other	Undecided
Fairleigh Dickinson University	Feb 12–16, 2020	715 (RV)	–	32%	56%	–	–

Donald Trump vs. Pete Buttigieg

Poll source	Date(s) administered	Sample size	Margin of error	Donald Trump (R)	Pete Buttigieg (D)	Other	Undecided
Fairleigh Dickinson University	Feb 12–16, 2020	715 (RV)	–	36%	48%	–	–

Donald Trump vs. Amy Klobuchar

Poll source	Date(s) administered	Sample size	Margin of error	Donald Trump (R)	Amy Klobuchar (D)	Other	Undecided
Fairleigh Dickinson University	Feb 12–16, 2020	715 (RV)	–	36%	47%	–	–

=== Results ===
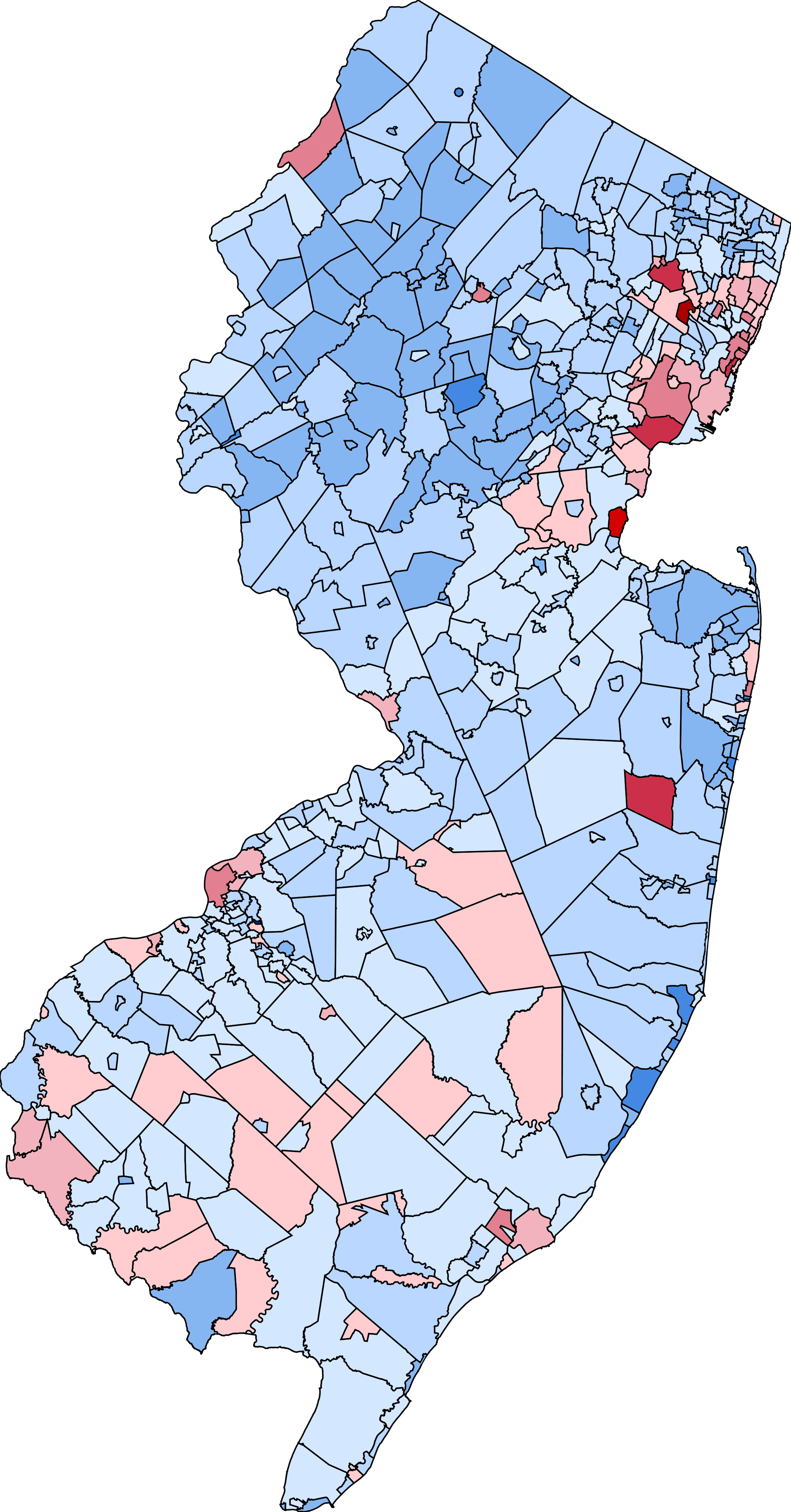

Vote share by Legislative district Trump: 40–50%; 50–60%; 60–70%; Biden: 50–60%; 60–70%; 70–80%

2020 United States presidential election in New Jersey
Party	Candidate	Votes	%	±%
Democratic	Joseph R. Biden Jr. Kamala D. Harris	2,608,400	57.33%	+1.87%
Republican	Donald Trump Mike Pence	1,883,313	41.40%	+0.05%
Libertarian	Jo Jorgensen Spike Cohen	31,677	0.70%	−1.17%
Green	Howie Hawkins Angela Walker	14,202	0.31%	−0.67%
Unity	Bill Hammons Eric Bodenstab	3,255	0.07%	±0.00%
Constitution	Don Blankenship William Mohr	2,954	0.06%	−0.10%
Socialism and Liberation	Gloria La Riva Sunil Freeman	2,928	0.06%	+0.02%
Alliance	Rocky De La Fuente Darcy Richardson	2,728	0.06%	+0.01%
Total votes		4,549,457	100.00%	N/A

==== By county ====
County	Joe Biden Democratic		Donald Trump Republican		Various candidates Other parties		Margin		Total votes cast
County	#	%	#	%	#	%	#	%	Total votes cast
Atlantic	73,808	52.71%	64,438	46.02%	1,785	1.27%	9,370	6.69%	140,031
Bergen	285,967	57.67%	204,417	41.23%	5,465	1.10%	81,550	16.45%	495,849
Burlington	154,595	59.12%	103,345	39.52%	3,557	1.36%	51,250	19.60%	261,497
Camden	175,065	66.16%	86,207	32.58%	3,344	1.26%	88,858	33.58%	264,616
Cape May	23,941	41.48%	33,158	57.45%	615	1.07%	-9,217	-15.97%	57,714
Cumberland	32,742	52.46%	28,952	46.39%	714	1.14%	3,790	6.07%	62,408
Essex	266,820	77.27%	75,475	21.86%	3,016	0.87%	191,345	55.41%	345,311
Gloucester	86,702	50.22%	83,340	48.27%	2,612	1.51%	3,362	1.95%	172,654
Hudson	181,452	72.62%	65,698	26.29%	2,700	1.08%	115,754	46.33%	249,850
Hunterdon	39,457	46.84%	43,153	51.23%	1,632	1.94%	-3,696	-4.39%	84,242
Mercer	122,532	69.38%	51,641	29.24%	2,431	1.38%	70,891	40.14%	176,604
Middlesex	226,250	60.44%	143,467	38.32%	4,645	1.24%	82,783	22.11%	374,362
Monmouth	181,291	47.94%	191,808	50.72%	5,052	1.34%	-10,517	-2.78%	378,151
Morris	153,881	51.41%	141,134	47.15%	4,307	1.44%	12,747	4.26%	299,322
Ocean	119,456	34.98%	217,740	63.76%	4,320	1.26%	-98,284	-28.78%	341,516
Passaic	129,097	57.71%	92,009	41.13%	2,601	1.16%	37,088	16.58%	223,707
Salem	14,479	42.68%	18,827	55.50%	616	1.82%	-4,348	-12.82%	33,922
Somerset	111,173	59.82%	71,996	38.74%	2,690	1.45%	39,177	21.08%	185,859
Sussex	34,481	39.20%	51,701	58.78%	1,781	2.02%	-17,220	-19.58%	87,963
Union	170,310	67.29%	80,038	31.62%	2,744	1.08%	90,272	35.67%	253,092
Warren	24,901	40.96%	34,769	57.20%	1,117	1.84%	-9,868	-16.23%	60,787
Totals	2,608,400	57.33%	1,883,313	41.40%	57,744	1.27%	725,087	15.94%	4,549,457

Counties that flipped from Republican to Democratic

- Gloucester (largest municipality: Washington Township)
- Morris (largest municipality: Parsippany)

==== By congressional district ====
Biden won nine out of the 12 congressional districts in New Jersey. Trump won three, including one that elected a Democrat.

District	Biden	Trump	Representative
1st	62%	37%	Donald Norcross
2nd	48%	51%	Jeff Van Drew
3rd	49.2%	49.4%	Andy Kim
4th	44%	55%	Chris Smith
5th	52%	47%	Josh Gottheimer
6th	57%	42%	Frank Pallone Jr.
7th	54%	44%	Tom Malinowski
8th	72%	27%	Albio Sires
9th	62%	37%	Bill Pascrell
10th	84%	15%	Donald Payne Jr.
11th	53%	46%	Mikie Sherrill
12th	67%	31%	Bonnie Watson Coleman

== Analysis ==
As the polls predicted, Joe Biden won New Jersey by a wide margin. Biden ran up huge margins in the state's major cities such as Newark, Jersey City, Paterson, Trenton, Atlantic City, Camden, and several others. In addition to carrying all the counties that Clinton won in 2016, Biden flipped Gloucester County, which was a reliably blue county before Trump won it in 2016. Biden also won Morris County, which had never voted Democratic in any presidential race since 1964; Senator Cory Booker concurrently won Morris County in his reelection victory as well. In neighboring Hunterdon County, Biden came within 4.4 points of victory despite the county being a reliably Republican stronghold as well. Biden recorded the highest share of the vote in Sussex and Hunterdon Counties for a Democrat since 1964, the last time either county voted Democratic.

Trump, meanwhile, performed strongly in Ocean County, which is reliably red. He also did well in Sussex and Warren counties, two northern rural counties that have not voted Democratic since 1964. Salem County, which Trump flipped in 2016, remained in his column and he also narrowly held on to Monmouth County, which has not voted Democratic since 2000 but where the margins have always been somewhat close. He also improved in the urban counties of Essex and Hudson, due to noticeable improvements in several of those counties' most populated cities, such as Jersey City and Newark.

Ultimately, Trump carried 255 of New Jersey's 565 municipalities, less than the 307 he carried in 2016, with Biden carrying the other 310. Compared to their 2016 margins, 471 of New Jersey's 565 municipalities swung towards Biden in this election. However, Trump was able to improve significantly upon his 2016 margins in many of New Jersey's most heavily populated cities, which kept the statewide margin within 2% of the 2016 results. For example, in New Jersey's most populated city, Newark, Trump nearly doubled his 2016 share of the vote, going from 6.63% to 12.25% of the vote. This was the best Republican performance in Newark since George W. Bush received 12.8% of the vote in 2004. Other populated cities, such as Paterson and Camden, posted similarly notable shifts towards the GOP, with much of the rest of the state shifting towards the Democrats instead.

=== Voter demographics ===
2020 presidential election in New Jersey voter demographics
Demographic subgroup	Biden	Trump	% of total vote
Total vote	57	41	100
Ideology
Liberals	92	7	34
Moderates	63	35	35
Conservatives	11	88	31
Party (including leaners)
Democrat or lean democrat	95	4	53
Republican or lean republican	10	89	42
Independent	55	41	5
Gender
Men	49	49	47
Women	64	35	53
Marital status
Married	54	44	61
Never married	68	30	23
Gender by marital status
Married men	47	49	29
Married women	58	41	31
Unmarried men	-	-	15
Unmarried women	68	31	25
Race/ethnicity
White	50	49	71
Black	86	12	11
Latino	72	27	11
Asian	76	23	3
Other	-	-	3
Gender by race/ethnicity
White men	42	56	33
White women	56	44	38
Black men	-	-	4
Black women	-	-	7
Latino men	-	-	6
Latina women	-	-	6
Other	66	32	7
Religion
Protestant/Other Christian	56	42	28
Catholic	47	52	39
Jewish	70	30	8
Other religion	67	32	7
None	73	25	17
White evangelical or born-again Christian
Yes	-	-	9
No	59	40	91
Age
18–24 years old	59	40	6
25–29 years old	66	32	4
30–39 years old	66	33	15
40–49 years old	57	41	14
50–64 years old	54	44	32
65 and older	54	46	28
Age by race
White 18–29 years old	57	42	7
White 30–44 years old	53	46	14
White 45–64 years old	47	52	28
White 65 and older	47	52	22
Nonwhite 18–29 years old	69	29	4
Nonwhite 30–44 years old	79	19	8
Nonwhite 45–64 years old	75	24	11
Nonwhite 65 and older	-	-	6
Sexual orientation
LGBT	-	-	6
Non-LGBT	57	42	94
Education
High school or less	54	44	25
Some college education or Associate degree	51	47	27
College graduate	63	36	30
Postgraduate degree	60	39	18
Education by race
White college graduates	57	42	35
White no college degree	42	56	35
Black college graduates	-	-	4
Black no college degree	-	-	7
Latino college graduates	-	-	4
Latino no college degree	69	29	7
All others	66	32	7
Education by race/gender
White women with college degrees	65	34	17
White women without college degrees	47	52	20
White men with college degrees	49	50	18
White men without college degrees	35	63	15
Nonwhite women with college degrees	84	15	7
Nonwhite women without college degrees	83	15	9
Nonwhite men with college degrees	68	30	6
Nonwhite men without college degrees	66	32	8
Income
Under $50,000	63	36	26
$50,000–99,999	55	44	37
$100,000 or more	55	43	37
Military service
Veterans	-	-	9
Veteran in household	-	-	14
Non-veterans	63	37	77
Issue regarded as most important
Racial inequality	80	20	9
COVID-19 pandemic	75	24	43
Economy	20	78	26
Crime and safety	-	-	4
Health care	79	19	10
Climate change	91	9	3
Area type
Urban	67	31	15
Suburban	59	40	62
Small town	48	51	15
Rural	44	56	8
Family's financial situation today
Getting ahead	-	-	13
Falling behind	66	34	17
Holding steady	57	43	70
Abortion should be
Legal in all/most cases	70	29	71
Illegal in all/most cases	25	72	28
Climate change is a serious problem
Yes	77	22	75
No	11	89	25

== See also ==
- United States presidential elections in New Jersey
- Presidency of Joe Biden
- 2020 New Jersey elections
- Bilingual elections requirement for New Jersey (per Voting Rights Act Amendments of 2006)
- 2020 United States presidential election
- 2020 Democratic Party presidential primaries
- 2020 Republican Party presidential primaries
- 2020 United States elections
