= ProntoForms =

Software company in Canada

TrueContext Corporation
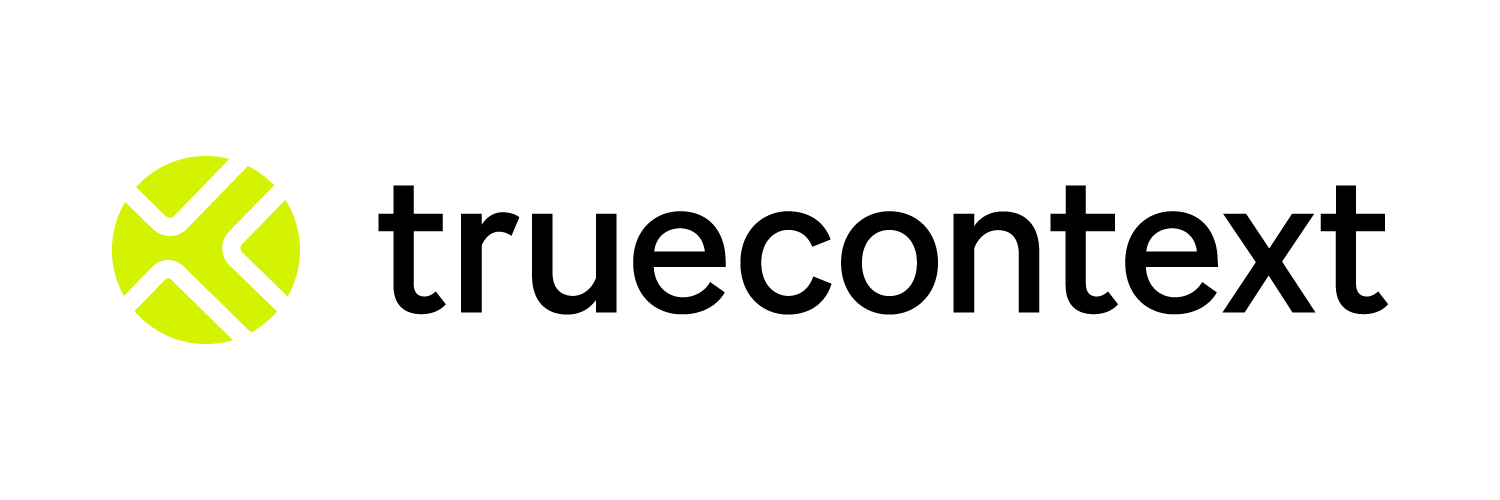
- Company type: Public
- Traded as: TSXV:
- Founded: Ottawa, Canada 2001
- Founder: Alvaro Pombo (CEO)
- Headquarters: Ottawa, Canada
- Products: Enterprise mobile software
- Revenue: $83.056 million USD
- Number of employees: 118
- Website: truecontext.com

TrueContext (TSXV: TCXT), formerly ProntoForms Corporation, is a Canadian app development business providing a low-code development platform for the construction of software and mobile apps. The application digitizes paperwork to complete forms on mobile devices, collect data, and send it. The company went public in 2005 and trades on the TSX Venture Exchange under the stock ticker symbol, PFM.

In November 2023 the company changed its name to TrueContext Corporation, and changed its stock ticker symbol to TCXT. TrueContext is a competitor of other digital forms providers like GoCanvas, GoFormz, and Formstack.

== History ==
ProntoForms was founded in 2001 in Ottawa, Canada, as TrueContext Mobile Solutions by CEO Alvaro Pombo. In 2007, the company launched its Pronto app in the United States for BlackBerry and Windows Mobile devices. Later, the app extended its support to Android and iOS devices. In 2013, the company officially changed its name to ProntoForms.

In 2019, ProntoForms was recognized in the 2019 Gartner "Magic Quadrant for Enterprise Low-Code Application Platforms" as one of 18 LCAP software vendors.

In November 2023, as part of a larger branding initiative, ProntoForms completed its name change to TrueContext Corporation. The announcement was launched to align the corporate identity with continuing product development in response to the evolving needs of the global field service landscape. With the advancement of platform and app capabilities and functionality, the product has grown to encompass a much larger scope than mobile forms.

== Products ==
TrueContext's flagship product is a low-code mobile app and software for field workers and technicians to collect, send, and receive data using mobile devices. The platform consists of an app and a drag-and-drop form builder. Integrations that transmit data to back-end and cloud systems and existing field service management software are also connected via a drag-and-drop interface.

Apps made with this platform are mainly used for field service. Dispatching and automatic notifications can also be included. Collected data can be exported to formats like PDF, CSV, Excel, and raw data files. After data is gathered, real-time dashboards and reports can be generated. Common use cases for ProntoForms include environmental, health & safety inspections, asset management, audits, delivery dispatch coordination, tracking time on service calls, and others.
