= Typeform =

Typeform may refer to:

- a typeform and a platen, two flat surfaces in printing
- Typeform (service), an online form and survey building website
