= Economy of Ontario =

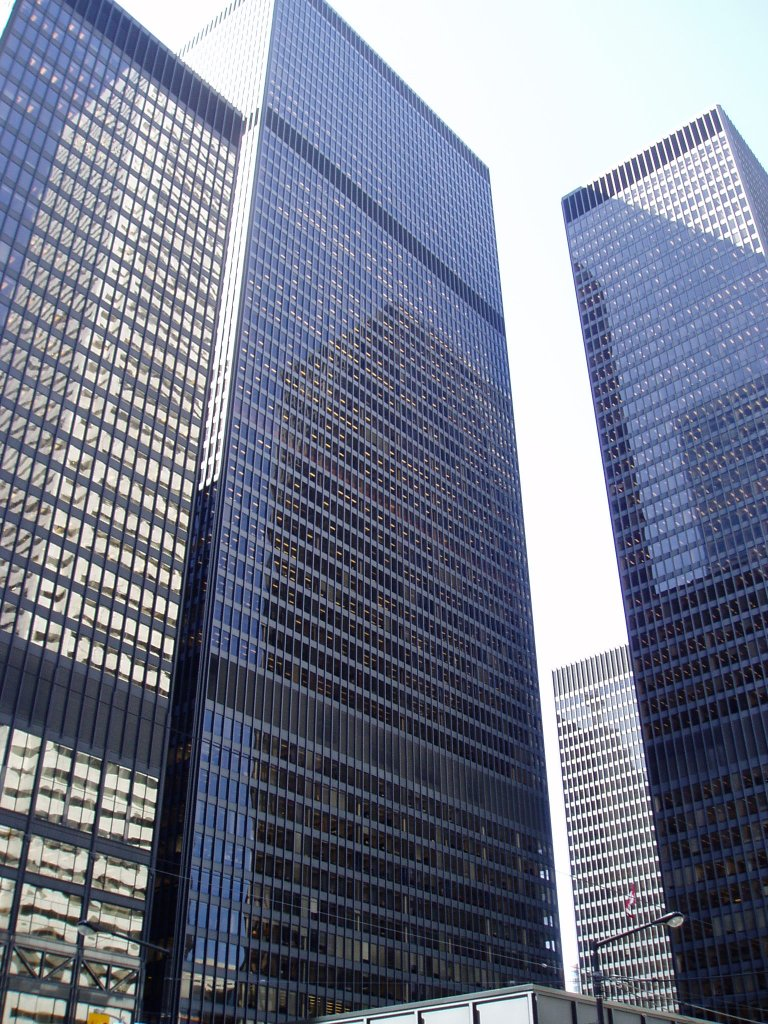
The Toronto-Dominion Centre in Toronto

The economy of Ontario is highly diversified. Ontario is the largest economy in Canada, making up around 38% of Canadian GDP. Though manufacturing plays an important role in Ontario's economy responsible for 12.6% of Ontario's GDP, the service sector makes up the bulk, 77.9%, of the economy. Ontario's net debt-to-GDP ratio will rise to 40.7% in the year 2019–2020.

Ontario is the most populous province of Canada, with a population of approximately 14.19 million permanent residents in 2017. It is Canada's leading manufacturing province, accounting for 46% of the manufacturing GDP in 2017.

The CPI inflation of the province in 2018 was confirmed to 2.2%, with the unemployment rate at 5.6% as of January 2019. This unemployment rate is based on the 447,400 unemployed people in Ontario. As of 2018, the province's credit rating ranged from AA-negative (Moody's) to A+-stable (S&P).

In 2017, Ontario's main international exports were motor vehicles and parts (35.3%), mechanical equipment (10.1%), precious metals and stones (9.8%), electrical machinery (3.9%), and plastic products (3.6%). Ontario's main international imports were motor vehicles parts and accessories (22.6%), mechanical equipment (14.4%), electrical machinery (11.4%), plastic products (3.9%) and pharmaceutical products (3.4%).

Ontario was the leading province for attracting foreign direct investment (FDI) in North America in 2013, with $7.23bn. This accounted for more than one-tenth of all FDI in North America. It was also the 4th biggest for outward FDI, recording $7.74bn.

During the 2025-26 fiscal year, Ontario reduced its net debt-to-gdp ratio to 35.2%, the lowest level in 15 years.

As of 2025, Ontario's economy was the third slowest-growing provincial economy in Canada due to U.S. tariffs, behind Quebec and ahead of British Columbia.

== History ==
The beginning of recorded history in Ontario is marked by the fur trade between Europeans and Native Americans, from which spawned various battles between various European and Native Americans peoples (the French, English, Iroquois and Hurons).

As a result of the Jay Treaty in 1793, the fur trade spread to the Northwest and the need for better transport facilities (in addition to the population) grew. 6000 bushels of wheat were bought at Kingston in 1799, and flour was sold in Montreal and Toronto in 1800. The American Revolution, French Revolution, and the Napoleonic Wars (in addition to subsequent immigration from the War of 1812) greatly stimulated the burgeoning timber trade in Ontario. The St. Lawrence became a monopoly route as other regions (like New York) lacked the waterways and rivers needed to transport timber. Between 1864 and 1866, 400 million board feet of British North American lumber passed through New York, and wood exports to the States from Canada were worth almost $7 million in 1866 to 1867. All the while, the demand for wheat and other agricultural products was growing, but was subjected to considerably greater competition from other regions, and the livestock and dairy industries, in addition to banks, which began to flourish.

In the early 20th century, Western Canada swelled with the influx of immigrant populations, and Ontario made the shift from being an export to domestic economy: the exported butter and cheese industry shifted into the milk industry for domestic consumption, winter dairying expanded, and the Ontario's apple industry declined in exports but increased consumption in Ontario and Western Canada.

In this time period, rail lines were constructed across Ontario and that the economy shifted toward greater industrialism and tapping into mineral resources—the mining, pulp and paper, and agriculture industries (in addition to hydro-electric power development) grew, and led to the growth of towns. Further industrial growth (which included those such as road construction, automobile factories, and the tourist trade) were encouraged by the war period.

== Sectors ==
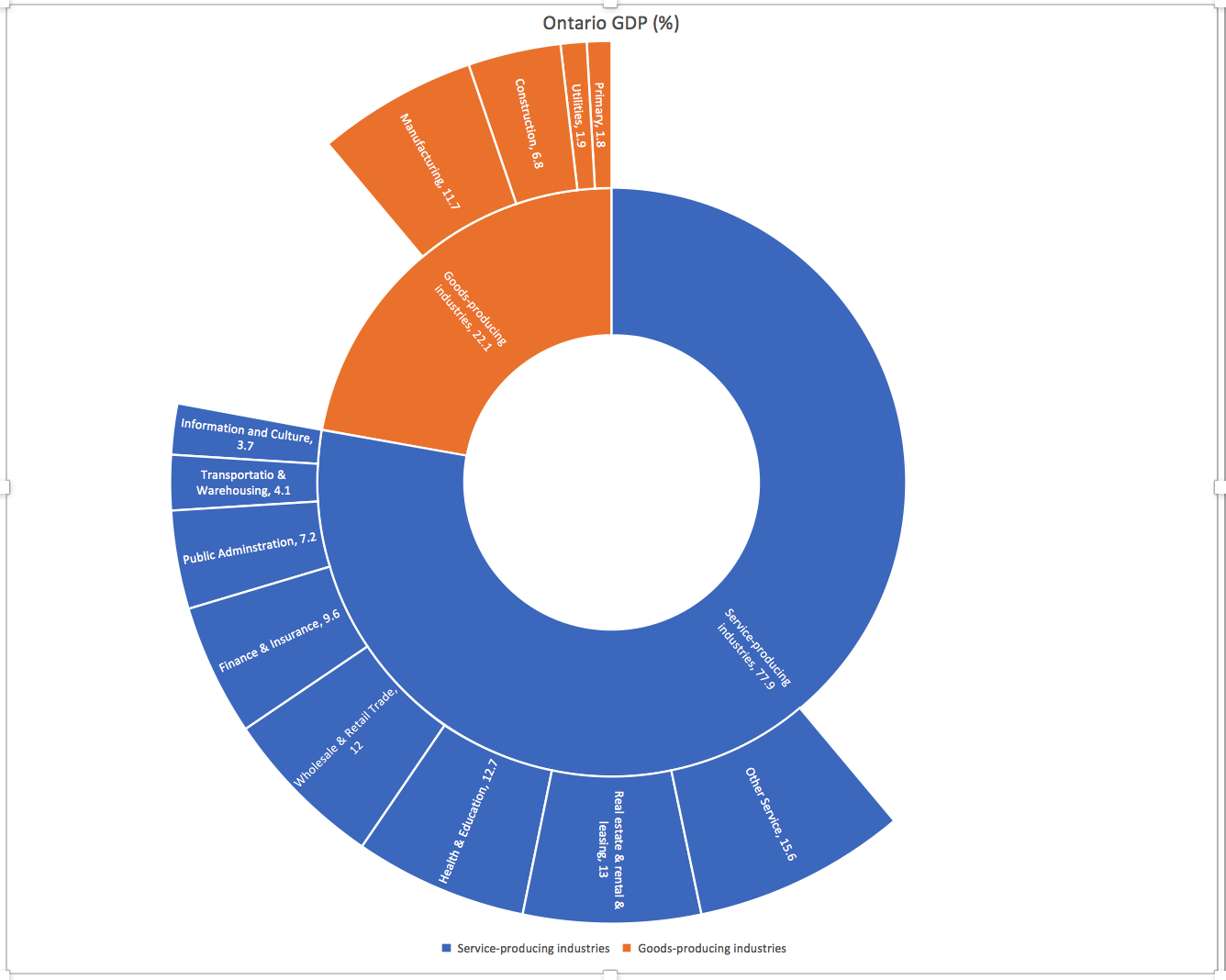
Contributions from various sectors to Ontario's GDP in 2017 measured in percent.

Approximately four-fifths of Ontario's GDP is composed of service sector industries. The remaining one fifth is the goods sector. More than half of the goods sector is manufacturing. One-third is the construction sector, and a tenth is the utility sector.

=== High tech ===
The province has a large technology sector, with one of North America's largest concentration of technology companies. Large Tech hubs exist in Ottawa, Toronto, Markham and Waterloo.

=== Agriculture ===
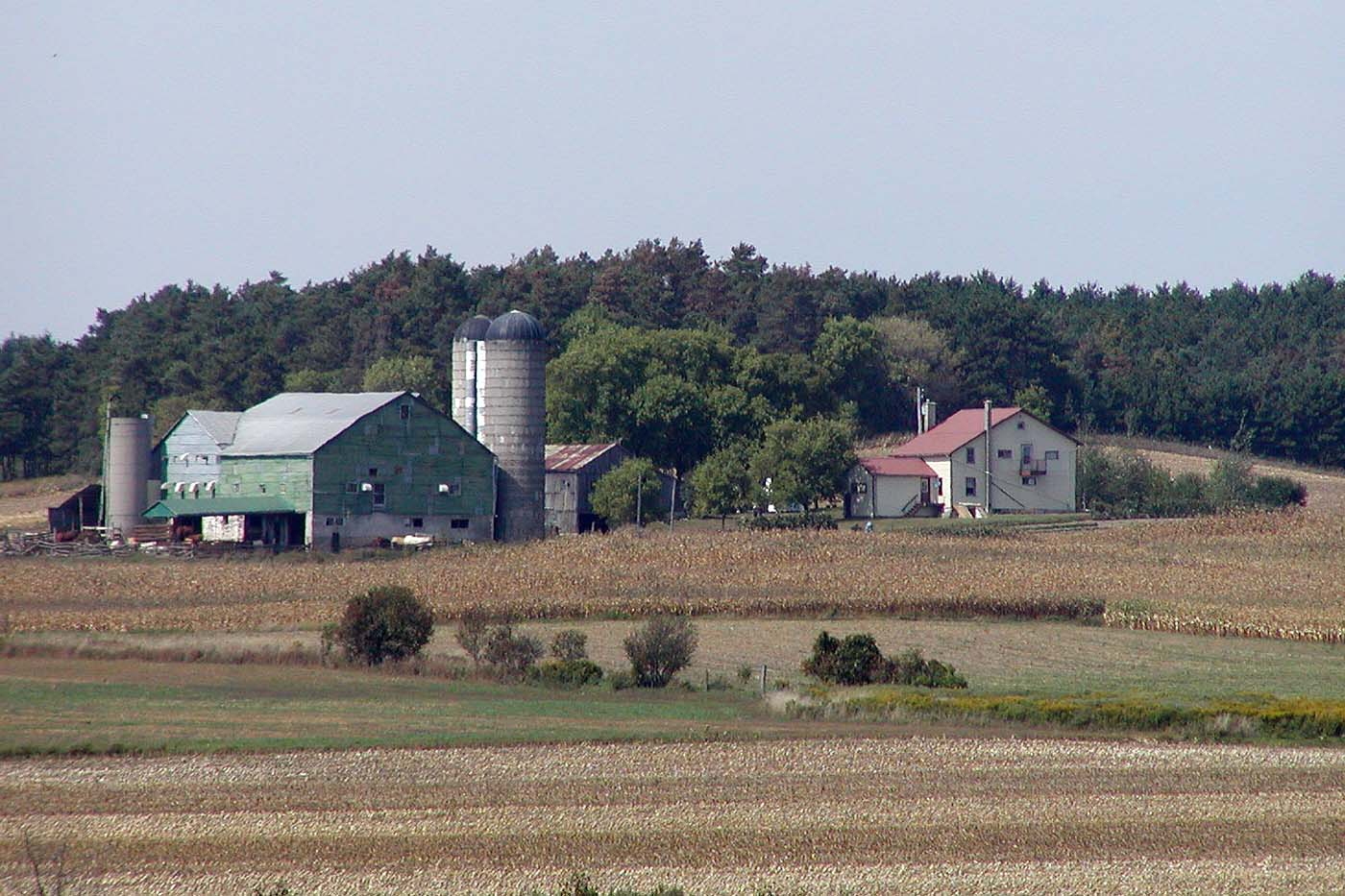
A farm, near Kitchener

The number of Ontario residents living on farms has been steadily declining for decades. In 2016 Ontario's farm population was 160,415, or 1.2 percent of the Ontario population. By way of contrast, in 1931, 800,960 Ontarians lived on farms.

The decline in farm population is partly driven by consolidation of the agricultural industry. There are fewer farms than in the past: The 2016 Census of Agriculture indicates that the number of farms declined 4.5% between 2011 and 2016 and, as of 2016, stands at 49,600 farms. However the average size of these farms is increasing. The average Ontario farm size was 101 hectares (249 acres) in 2016, up 0.2% from 2011. Since 1981, the average farm size has increased by 27.3% from 73 hectares (181 acres).

Ontario's total farm area has declined 2.5% since 2011 to 4,997,246 hectares (12,348,463 acres) in 2016. However, cropland increased 15.5% to just over 23,000 hectares (56,000 acres), the highest level since 1941. Eastern Ontario led the increase with a gain of 31% in cropland.

=== Manufacturing ===
The manufacturing sector employed 764,000 persons in August 2019. The province has lost 300,000 manufacturing jobs in the ten years 2003–2013.

=== Energy ===
The Green Energy and Green Economy Act, 2009 (GEGEA), takes a two-pronged approach to creating a renewable-energy economy. The first is to bring more renewable energy sources to the province and the second is the creation of more energy efficiency measures to help conserve energy. The bill would also appoint a Renewable Energy Facilitator to provide one-window assistance and support to project developers in order to facilitate project approvals. The approvals process for transmission projects would also be streamlined and for the first time in Ontario, the bill would enact standards for renewable energy projects. Homeowners would have access to incentives to develop small-scale renewables such as low- or no-interest loans to finance the capital cost of renewable energy generating facilities like solar panels. Solar panels are also manufactured in Ontario.

=== Mining ===
Hard-rock mining has taken place in the province for over 140 years (as of 2022). The mining industry in Ontario produces more than 30 different metal and non-metal mineral products, and is responsible for a major percentage of Canada's nickel, gold, copper and platinum-group metals production. The extraction of metallic minerals is concentrated in Northern Ontario, while the southern portion of the province produces salt, gypsum, lime, nepheline syenite and structural materials (sand, gravel, stone), along with some petroleum. As of 2014, the mining industry produced about $11 billion worth of minerals. Derisory fees are charged by the government for prospecting licences ($25.50) and exploration permits (nil), in keeping with the duty of economic development of the province. The exploration permit process is meant as a means to notify interested parties, such as surface landowners, of the activities of miners. The development of a mine proceeds through "advanced exploration" to "production" status, the legislation for which is detailed in the Mining Act of Ontario; this covers hard-rock, aggregate, diamond and petroleum mines.

== Infrastructure ==
=== Road ===
Southern Ontario has a well-developed transportation infrastructure that allows for the efficient transportation of goods. The province has a number of controlled-access highways with the 400-Series highways which run primarily west to east from Michigan and New York through to Quebec and facilitate trade with the United States.

=== Air ===
The province has a number of significant airports including the 30th busiest airport in the world Pearson International, Ottawa Macdonald–Cartier International Airport and Munro International located in Hamilton which is one of the largest cargo airports in Canada and is Canada's busiest overnight cargo airport.

=== Marine ===
There is also a significant maritime industry in Ontario in spite of its position mid-continent as it benefits from the Great Lakes, Welland Canal and St. Lawrence Seaway. Major Great Lakes ports include the Port of Hamilton, Port of Thunder Bay and Port of Windsor.

== See also ==
- Economy of Toronto
- Great Lakes Megalopolis
- Canada's Global Markets Action Plan
- Free trade agreements of Canada
- Goderich, Ontario
- List of companies based in Ottawa
- Geology of Ontario
