= SurveyMonkey =

American technology company

SurveyMonkey Inc.

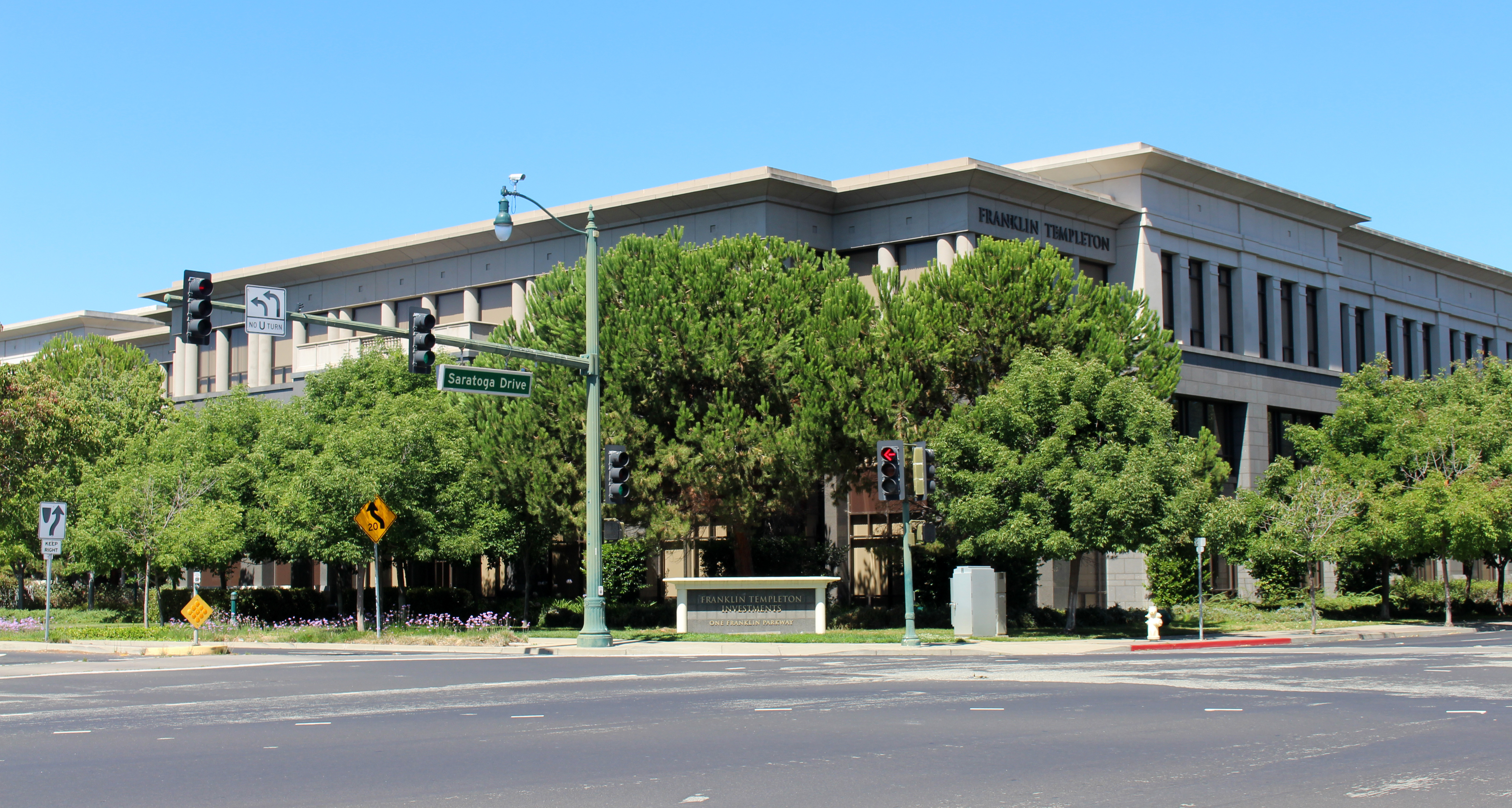
- Headquarters at Franklin Templeton Investments headquarters in San Mateo
- Formerly: Momentive Global Inc. (2021–23)
- Type: Private (1999–2018, since 2023)
- Traded as: Nasdaq: MNTV (2021–23); Nasdaq: SVMK (2018–21)
- Industry: Software as a service; Online survey services
- Founded: 1999; 27 years ago
- Founders: Ryan Finley; Chris Finley
- Headquarters: San Mateo, California, U.S.
- Number of locations: San Mateo, Portland, Dublin, Ottawa, Amsterdam, Padua, Bengaluru, Heredia
- Area served: Worldwide
- Key people: John Ouren (CEO)
- Products: Software-as-a-service (SaaS)
- Revenue: ▲US$481 million (2022)
- Operating income: ▲US$−81 million (2022)
- Net income: ▲US$−90 million (2022)
- Total assets: ▼US$810 million (2022)
- Total equity: ▼US$287 million (2022)
- Owner: Symphony Technology Group
- Number of employees: 1,300 (November 2023)
- Website: surveymonkey.com

SurveyMonkey Inc. (formerly Momentive Global Inc. from 2021 to 2023) is an American software-as-a-service (SaaS) company that provides online survey and forms tools. Originally founded in 1999 by Ryan and Chris Finley, the company’s platform allows individuals and organizations to collect data and gain insights through customizable surveys and forms. Headquartered in San Mateo, California, SurveyMonkey is used globally in business, education, healthcare, government, and non-profit sectors.

On June 9, 2021, SurveyMonkey announced its rebrand to Momentive with the intent to better represent their experience management and enterprise applications product suite. SurveyMonkey continued to operate as a subsidiary survey platform. The Momentive Inc. product portfolio included Momentive, SurveyMonkey, GetFeedback, and TechValidate.

In June 2023, the company rebranded itself back to SurveyMonkey after being acquired by an investor group led by Symphony Technology Group.

== History ==
=== Founding and early growth (1999-2009) ===
SurveyMonkey was founded in 1999 by Ryan Finley, who later brought on his brother, Chris Finley. Seeking a simple way to collect customer feedback and finding no suitable tools available, he developed his own solution—SurveyMonkey. In 2005, Finley relocated the company to Portland, Oregon, where he and his brother Chris transported the company’s servers themselves. While the company was initially bootstrapped, it grew in popularity to a rumored $30 million in revenue.

=== Private equity investment and expansion (2009-2015) ===
In 2009, Spectrum Equity and Bain Capital acquired a majority stake in the company. During this time, Dave Goldberg, a former Yahoo executive, served as CEO and led the company through a period of rapid growth. This included growing from 12 employees to over 450, and helping the company achieve an almost $2 billion valuation. The company also acquired startups, Wufoo and FluidReview (later renamed to SurveyMonkey Apply), and released its first mobile app and enterprise-focused plan.

In 2010, the company received $100 million in debt financing from Bank of America Merrill Lynch and SunTrust Robinson Humphrey.

In early 2013, SurveyMonkey relocated its headquarters from Portland to Palo Alto, California, in the heart of Silicon Valley.

By 2013, SurveyMonkey raised $800 million in debt and equity valuing the company at $1.35 billion. In September 2013, the company announced HIPAA-compliant features for premium subscription holders.

In 2014, the company raised $250 million in equity financing from Google Capital (now CapitalG), Tiger Global Management, Baillie Gifford, T. Rowe Price and Morgan Stanley.

In 2017, the company moved again, establishing a new, larger headquarters in San Mateo at One Curiosity Way.

Goldberg died in 2015.

=== Product growth & diversification (2015-2020) ===
Following Goldberg’s death, in May 2015, Zander Lurie was named interim executive chairman of SurveyMonkey. He had served on SurveyMonkey’s board since 2009.

On August 3, 2015, Bill Veghte replaced Goldberg as SurveyMonkey CEO. Veghte held top positions at HP and Microsoft. Veghte left the role after fewer than 6 months due to strategic differences with investors and was replaced by Zander Lurie in January 2016. The company expanded into new lines of business, acquiring several startups, including Usabilla, a website and app survey company, and GetFeedback, a customer experience company.

In 2017, the company introduced "SurveyMonkey Genius," a set of AI features that uses automated systems to estimate survey performance and makes actionable suggestions to increase survey effectiveness. Over the following years, these capabilities were expanded to include automated survey creation and data analysis tools. In 2025, the company rebranded these features under the name "SurveyMonkey AI". The system is trained on the company's proprietary dataset.

=== IPO and Rebrand to Momentive (2018-2023) ===
SurveyMonkey went public on the Nasdaq under the ticker SVMK in September 2018. At the time, board members included Serena Williams, Brad Smith, David Ebersman, and Sheryl Sandberg.

Emory University Goizueta Business School dean Erika James joined the SurveyMonkey board of directors in 2018, creating Gender Parity on the company's board.

After the emergency phase of the COVID-19 pandemic, SurveyMonkey used its own survey product to determine its employees' preferences as to their working arrangements. 84% voted for a flexible work policy, 81% wanted to work from home up to three days per week, and only 5% preferred to be back in the office all the time.

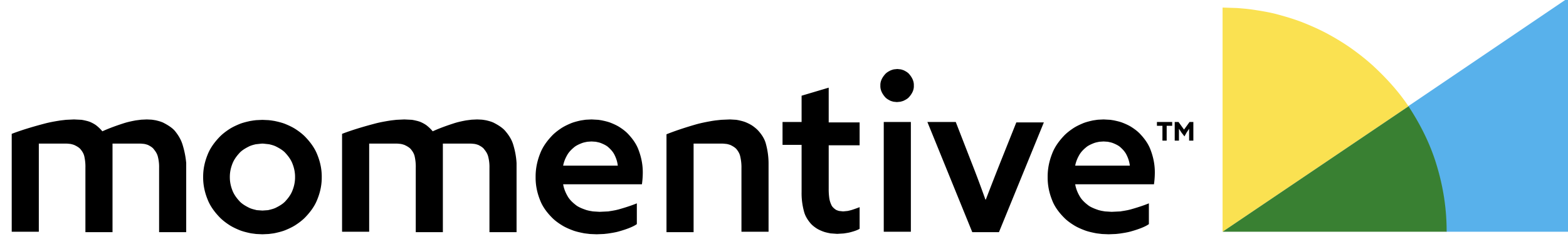
Momentive logo

In 2021, SurveyMonkey’s parent company rebranded as Momentive, keeping SurveyMonkey as the name of the core product. The decision to rebrand was made to reflect a broader focus on experience management and enterprise applications.

On October 28, 2021, Zendesk announced that it had agreed to acquire Momentive for about $4.1 billion, in an all-stock deal. Chief executive officer Mikkel Svane of Zendesk said of the acquisition, "We have a big overlap in customers. It's incredibly powerful. And we believe that it will create a whole new, richer picture of your customers," according to Reuters. Although shareholders of Momentive Global Inc. approved the deal, Zendesk's shareholders voted against the acquisition. Subsequently the deal was terminated.

=== Acquisition and Return to SurveyMonkey Brand (2023-present) ===
In March 2023, STG acquired Momentive in a $1.5 billion all-cash transaction. Following the acquisition, the company returned to the SurveyMonkey brand to unify the company's portfolio under a single brand, and Eric Johnson was named CEO. On October 7, 2026, Johnson was replaced as CEO by John Ouren, a SurveyMonkey board member.

As of 2025, the company has physical locations in San Mateo, California, United States; Portland, Oregon, United States; Ottawa, Canada; Dublin, Ireland; Amsterdam, The Netherlands; Padua, Italy; and Bengaluru, India; and Heredia, Costa Rica.

=== Acquisitions ===
In 2015, SurveyMonkey acquired TechValidate, a Canadian marketing content automation company and Renzu Inc.

The company has acquired six other survey tools: GetFeedback, Usabilla, Fluidware, Precision Polling, Wufoo, and Zoomerang, as well as a 49.9 percent stake in the UK-based Clicktools.

== Products and services ==
SurveyMonkey offers products for building and collecting information via forms as well as survey creation, distribution, data analysis, and reporting. As of 2025, the company’s platform has been used by over 250,000 organizations worldwide and has collected more than 100 billion questions answered, supported by 42 million global users.

=== Products ===
As of 2025, SurveyMonkey’s products include:

- SurveyMonkey (for surveys and forms)
- SurveyMonkey Audience (helps users find survey panel respondents for market research)
- SurveyMonkey Enterprise (for businesses)
- SurveyMonkey Apply (application management software for grants, scholarships, and awards)

=== Services ===
SurveyMonkey provides the following services:

- AI-assisted question generation and analysis
- Survey templates and question bank
- Multiple question types and advanced logic
- Custom branding and survey design
- Collaboration features for teams
- Real-time analytics and dashboards

To recruit panel respondents for SurveyMonkey Audience, SurveyMonkey offers SurveyMonkey Contribute and SurveyMonkey Rewards. SurveyMonkey Contribute lets users donate to a charity of their choice after taking a survey. Participating charities have included Doctors Without Borders, American Red Cross, and The Humane Society of the United States. Through SurveyMonkey Rewards, users take paid surveys and earn rewards, which can be redeemed as gift cards or donated to charity.

== Business model ==
SurveyMonkey operates on a freemium and subscription-based model, offering individual, team, and enterprise plans, along with services and add-ons for enterprise customers. It serves a global customer base including Fortune 500 companies, educational institutions, startups, and nonprofits. The company supports surveys in 56+ languages and is used in over 190 countries.

== Research ==
SurveyMonkey regularly conducts research into HR-focused topics such as workplace culture and trends, workforce happiness, gender and generational divides, marketing topics, customer experience (CX) topics and small business sentiment. The company has also partnered with organizations such as CNBC, Parity, The 19th, HubSpot, and others to provide data insights, and has supported polling with NBC News.

== Leadership ==
Notable SurveyMonkey leadership includes:

- Ryan Finley, Co-founder
- Dave Goldberg, CEO (2009–2015)
- Zander Lurie, CEO (2016–2023)
- Eric Johnson, current CEO (2023-present, post-acquisition by STG)

== See also ==
- Comparison of survey software
