= SurveyLab =

Survey management tool

- Other names: MySurveyLab
- Developer: 7 Points sp. z o.o.
- Initial release: 2006; 20 years ago
- Operating system: Cross-platform
- Platform: Web, iOS, Android
- Available in: All languages
- Type: Survey management; Computer-assisted survey information collection; Questionnaire construction; Data collection; Mobile forms
- License: Proprietary
- Website: surveylab.com
- As of: December 2025

SurveyLab is an online system designed for creating and deploying surveys, questionnaires, web forms, tests, and quizzes. The platform functions as a web application, without the need for additional software installation.

Founded in 2006, by the Polish company 7 Points, SurveyLab is used by businesses and professional users for market research, human resources assessments, customer feedback, and academic research.

== History ==
SurveyLab was launched in 2006 under the name MySurveyLab, developed by the Warsaw-based company 7 Points. Early media coverage described the system as supporting online survey creation, real-time reporting, group collaboration and question logic, and noted that the platform was opened to custom feature development.

MySurveyLab featured multi-user accounts, SSL-secured surveys, and support for right-to-left languages. Further 2010s updates improved reporting capabilities, expanded question types, and integration options.

In 2020, the platform was rebranded to SurveyLab. By the early 2020s, the software supported integrations with external tools including Zapier, and offered additional analytics features. In 2025, 7 Points reported that SurveyLab had over 85,000 registered users and had processed over 7 million surveys.

== Functionalities ==
SurveyLab is a web-based platform used for creating online surveys, questionnaires, and forms. Independent reviewers and software directories describe it as a tool used for market research, customer feedback management, and human resources-related assessments, including employee feedback surveys. According to the creators at 7 Points, SurveyLab supports customer satisfaction measurement, survey analysis, and 360-degree feedback evaluations. The platform allows users to create surveys with no limits on the number of questions or responses.

Independent reviews describe SurveyLab as offering multiple-choice, matrix, rating-scale, and open-ended questions. According to 7 Points, the platform manages market-research workflows, including Net Promoter Score, Customer Satisfaction, and Customer Effort Score questions. The tool can also re-use previous answers in later questions, and create A/B survey variants.

SurveyLab can integrate with external services and applications through APIs and third-party connectors. According to its developers, the platform can connect with customer service tools, as well as CRM, marketing automation, e-commerce, and data-storage tools An industry review cited workflow integrations with CINT, Slack, Salesforce, and Zendesk Other integrations included Aquera (SSO), Sona Systems (internet research), and Synerise (customer data management).

== Data collection and aggregation ==
Independent descriptions note that SurveyLab can combine results from emails, SMS, website widgets and pop-ups, QR codes, and social media. Its surveys are also accessible through mobile apps on iOS and Android, used for online and offline data collection in the field. Developers state that the tool supports exporting data as CSV, Excel, and SPSS, with independent reviews also mentioning PDF and PowerPoint.

SurveyLab can automate response collection through a multi-channel survey distribution and reporting. It includes data trends, offline responses, and reminders to non-respondents. According to its documentation, newer versions include AI-based tools that detect and analyze sentiment, and a survey builder generating questionnaires based on user prompts.

=== Data security and compliance ===
According to 7 Points, SurveyLab provides password-protected surveys, token-based access, IP-address filtering, and two-factor authentication for user accounts, and it complies with the General Data Protection Regulation.

== Awards and accolades ==
In 2017, SurveyLab was listed in Capterra’s Top 20 Survey Software ranking, among 20 highest-scoring survey tools based on market presence and user base.

In 2018, a software review platform FinancesOnline awarded SurveyLab the Rising Star Award and the Great User Experience Award, distinctions given to products that demonstrate positive user satisfaction and strong usability characteristics.
