= Survio =

- Company type: Private
- Available in: Czech, Danish, Dutch, English, Finnish, French, German, Hungarian, Italian, Norwegian, Polish, Portuguese (Brazil), Portuguese (Portugal), Romanian, Russian, Slovak, Spanish, Swedish, Ukrainian
- Founded: 2012
- Headquarters: Hlinky 80, Brno; Czech Republic
- Area served: Worldwide
- Founders: Ondrej Coufalik, Martin Pavlicek
- CEO: Ondrej Coufalik, CEO
- Industry: Online survey services
- Products: Online survey tool
- Website: www.survio.com
- Registration: Required for creating a survey
- Users: 1,000,000

Survio is an online survey system for the preparation of questionnaires, data collection and analysis and sharing the results. Survio is a project of Czech creators from the city of Brno, which is also referred to as the Czech Silicon Valley.

== History ==
=== Founding ===
Survio was established in 2012. The project was founded by Ondřej Coufalík and Martin Pavlíček. The inspiration came in 2008 when Martin who was lying ill in the hospital, had to fill out multiple paper forms. Both men, therefore, in 2008, founded the predecessor of Survio, a company named Global Business IT s. r. o. With the idea of the questionnaire system then started the development in the South Moravian innovation center.

=== Development ===
Already in 2012 company Webnode invested, one and a half million Czech crowns (US$20 thousand) and acquired 35% stake of Survio. This investment started very rapid growth of the online inquiry project. From the very beginning of the project, users had 11 languages available. The start of the project proved to be very successful and at the end of the first year of operation Survio had 100 thousand users from 124 countries of the world.

=== Since 2020 ===
In January 2020, Survio achieved a year-on-year growth of 60%, and its Annual Recurring Revenue (ARR) increased to 2 million EUR. The application is localized into 17 world languages to cover 198 countries where Survio is used to create surveys. The company is headquartered in Brno, where the development team, marketing, product, and sales departments, including customer support, are also located. As of May 31, 2021, Survio employed 30 people.

== Services ==
Users can either create their own surveys or use pre-designed templates and customize them. The types of questions offered vary, including multiple-choice, text, ranking, matrix questions, semantic differential, and Net Promoter Score. Advanced settings allow logical question skips, redirecting respondents to the survey owner's website upon completion, and integration with other platforms (e.g., Google Sheets or Google Analytics).

Customers can offer surveys for completion in various ways – mass email invitations, social media, embedding surveys on websites, using URL links, or QR codes. The forms are also optimized for mobile devices. The results are automatically processed into tables and graphs, with filtering options and the ability to generate reports in common formats – pdf, docx, or pptx.

Online surveys are used in marketing research (customer satisfaction, product/service evaluation, market research), human resources (employee surveys, motivation surveys, 360° feedback), education (course evaluations, school equipment surveys, satisfaction with school cafeteria), healthcare (patient satisfaction surveys, physical condition surveys, pharmacy evaluations), and event agencies (corporate event evaluations, trip organization, concert planning).

Survio offers its services under the SaaS (Software as a Service) model. The software is provided over the internet without the need for installation or configuration on the user's device. Its business model is freemium, making certain features available to all customers for free while charging for premium features. Survey data is stored in cloud storage, and the transfer between the user's device and the respective servers is encrypted using an EV SSL certificate. Users can download exports and reports directly to their local devices for further comparison or statistical purposes.

== SaaS Movement ==
Since 2018, Survio has co-organized the professional conference SaaS Movement with companies Smartlook and Smartsupp. The conference aims to bring together experts from the SaaS environment, present trends, and share know-how among SaaS projects. Past participants included companies like Pipedrive, Avast, Kiwi.com, and Cleverbridge.

== Customer base ==
Survio is designed especially for small and medium-sized enterprises (SMEs). The service is also suitable for all who need to prepare their own questionnaires: offices, schools, students, non-profit organizations, etc.

Currently, Survio serves more than 1 million users from 170 countries. The system is popular in Europe and Latin America. Survio users include a number of businesses, offices, and schools including universities. Clients include IBM, Tesco, FedEx, Bosch, Oriflame, BMW, Microsoft, Ford etc.

== Prices ==
The basic version of the Survio is available for free. Survio also offers paid premium service. In the advanced menu, there are also specific types of questionnaires, such as, for example, NPS Net promoter score or 360 degree feedback.

== See also ==
- Comparison of survey software
