= Typeform (service) =

Online form and survey building website

Typeform S.L.
- Type: Private
- Industry: Online survey services
- Founded: 2012; 14 years ago
- Founders: Robert Muñoz, David Okuniev
- Headquarters: Barcelona, Spain
- Area served: Worldwide
- Number of employees: 500
- Website: typeform.com

Typeform is a software as a service (SaaS) company that specializes in online form building and online surveys. Its main software creates dynamic forms based on user needs. Typeform's software has been used by Apple Inc., Airbnb, Uber and Nike, Inc. Typeform produces millions of forms every month. Typeform is a competitor of other digital forms platforms, such as GoFormz, Formstack, and GoCanvas.

== History ==
=== Founding and growth (2012-2015) ===
Typeform was founded in 2012 by Robert Muñoz and David Okuniev. Typeform's software was released in Alpha phase by invitation only. The software launched in Beta in April 2013, having raised €550,000 in seed funding. The company generated an additional €1.2 million in 2014.

Typeform's software officially launched in February 2014. By August 2014, the software had 100,000 users. In October 2015, the company raised $15 million in Series A funding led by London-based Index Ventures. Previous investors Point Nine Capital, Connect Ventures, RTA Ventures, CEO of Squarespace Anthony Casalena, Facebook Vice President of growth Javier Olivan, and Jay Parikh of Facebook also participated in the funding round.

=== Security breach and continued growth (2018-2025) ===
On June 27, 2018, the Typeform engineering team became aware that an unknown third party gained access to the Typeform server and obtained access to customer data and downloaded it. The attackers gained access to data backups for surveys conducted before May 3rd, 2018. Over 100,000 records were affected.

In March 2022, Typeform announced the close of a $135 million Series C ledby Belgian investment firm Sofina, with participation from existing investors such as General Atlantic and Index Ventures. The round brought the company’s total funding to approximately $187 million.

== Software ==
The "typeforms" present questions which slide down one after another showing only one question at a time to keep users engaged and can include images, and GIFs or videos. The tool includes "Calculator," custom "Thank You" screens, "Question Groups" which allow questions to be added to sections or include sub-questions and "Logic Jump" which customizes the questions a user sees based on their selections. The form can be embedded into a website, open in a pop-up, or be accessed through a unique URL. The form-builder uses a freemium business model.

Typeform I/O was a developer API which creates forms based on user data. The API allows users to generate forms using code rather than the traditional Typeform tool. Typeform.io was a standalone service, not connected with Typeform.com. This service was discontinued in early 2018.

Typeform launched a developer platform in September 2017. Developer-oriented APIs & SDKs are similar to Typeform.io's functionality, but is now integrated into the rest of the platform. Developers can create forms programmatically using Create API, retrieve form results using Responses API or Webhooks, and perform advanced form embedding with the Embedding SDK.'

Typeform launched a no-code chatbot builder, Chat by Typeform, in June 2021.

== See also ==
- Comparison of survey software
