= KCC Corporation =

South Korean company

KCC Corporation 주식회사 케이씨씨
- Company type: Public
- Traded as: KRX: 002380
- Industry: Automotive, chemicals
- Founded: 12 August 1958; 67 years ago
- Headquarters: Seoul, South Korea
- Area served: Worldwide
- Products: Automotive parts, chemicals
- Subsidiaries: Samsung C&T Corporation (9.1% equity); Basildon Chemicals; Momentive Performance Materials, Inc. (100%)
- Website: www.kccworld.co.kr/eng/main.do

KCC Corporation (renamed from Kumkang Korea Chemicals Co., Ltd. in 2005) is a South Korean chemical and auto parts manufacturer, headquartered in Seoul, South Korea.

== Operations ==
KCC's products include various kinds of paints, float glass, soft sponges, silicon, chassis, and car parts. This company is the biggest provider of construction materials and paints in South Korea. Various types of industrial materials such as epoxy moulding compound, alumina metallizing, silicone etc. are produced in 13 domestic locations.
KCC Corporation has 9 overseas liaison offices and 7 overseas factories over the world:

- KCC Houston (Texas, U.S. - Liaison Office)
- KCC Tokyo (Tokyo, Japan - Liaison Office)
- KCC Hong Kong (Hong Kong, China - Liaison Office)
- KCC Dubai (Dubai, U.A.E. - Liaison Office)
- KCC Greece (Piraeus, Greece - Liaison Office)
- KCC Hamburg (Hamburg, Germany - Liaison Office)
- KCC Iran (Teheran, Iran - Liaison Office)
- KCC Shanghai (Shanghai, China - Liaison Office)
- KCC Kunshan (Shanghai, China - Paint Factory)
- KCC Beijing (Beijing, China - Paint Factory)
- KCC Guangzhou (Guangzhou, China - Paint Factory)
- KCC Singapore (Singapore - Paint Factory)
- KCC Malaysia (Kuala Lumpur, Malaysia - Paint Factory)
- KCC India (Chennai, India - Paint Factory)
- KCC Turkey (Istanbul, Turkey - Paint Factory)
- KCC Poland (Lublin, Poland - Liaison Office)
- KCC Vietnam (Ho Chi Minh, VietNam - Liaison Office)

== Acquisitions ==
In April 2011, Basildon Chemicals was purchased by the KCC Corporation. KCC expanded into silicone emulsification with the acquisition.

In 2024, KCC Corporation acquired U.S.-based Momentive Performance Materials, Inc. for an undisclosed amount.

== See also ==
- Economy of South Korea
- Busan KCC Egis
