= Zander Lurie =

- Education: University of Washington, Emory University
- Occupation: CEO
- Known for: Momentive (maker of Surveymonkey and Getfeedback), CEO, CoachArt founder

Zander Lurie is an American business executive and former CEO of Momentive (maker of Surveymonkey and Getfeedback). He is also a board member of GoPro.

== Education ==
Lurie earned a bachelor's degree from the University of Washington and a JD and MBA from Emory University.

== Career ==
In 2001, Lurie founded the non-profit organization CoachArt.

Lurie is the former CFO of CBS Interactive, as well as a former senior vice president of entertainment at GoPro.

In July 2015, Lurie was named the SurveyMonkey chairman of the board. In 2016, he was appointed CEO of SurveyMonkey.

Lurie has been an active GoPro board member since 2016.
