= Pronexus =

Canadian software company

Pronexus Inc.
- Company type: Privately Held
- Industry: Telecommunications
- Founded: 1994
- Headquarters: Ottawa, Ontario, Canada
- Key people: CEO: Gary Hannah
- Products: VBVoice

Pronexus is a software company established in 1994 and located in Ottawa, Ontario. They specialise in producing tools for voice applications and Interactive Voice Response (IVR) for use in integrating voice/speech technology in business systems. The company is known for its development of VBVoice, which is a rapid application development (RAD) Interactive Voice Response (IVR) toolkit for telephony and speech for use in Microsoft Visual Studio. First introduced in 1994, VBVoice includes a graphical user interface (GUI) for call flow and call control. The VBVoice toolkit allows for creation of various IVR applications, such as auto attendants, outbound IVRs, predictive dialers, and self-service IVRs.

== History ==
2020

- ProNexus LLC. joined the Oracle NetSuite Solution Provider Program

2010

- Pronexus releases VBVoice 7
- Pronexus launches IVR solutions locator
- Pronexus achieves Microsoft Gold Certified Partner status
- Pronexus partners with distributor Bludis

2009

- Pronexus opens Competency Center in Mumbai, India under joint operating agreement with Techtree IT
- Pronexus wins its 14th Product of the Year award for VBVoice
- VBVoice 5.6 IVR Development Application voted "Best Development Tool" at World's Communication Conference – ITEXPO EAST 2009

2007

- Pronexus introduces a Japanese version of its Interactive Voice Response (IVR) toolkit VBVoice

2004

- Pronexus awarded "Innovation Award of Excellence - Exporting"

2003

- Gary T. Hannah named a recipient of the 'Forty under 40' Award

2001

- Gary T. Hannah and employees acquire Pronexus ownership, making it a 100% private, Canadian corporation

2000

- Active Voice takes 100% interest in Pronexus, making it a wholly owned subsidiary of Active Voice
- Gary T. Hannah is named president and CEO of Pronexus
- Pronexus announces partnership with Nuance Communications

1997

- Active Voice acquires 51% shares in Pronexus

1996

- VBVoice awarded 1st Computer Telephony Product of the Year

1994

- Pronexus is incorporated and VBVoice is launched, Microsoft an early adopter

1993

- Ian Bowles, founder of Pronexus, starts programming VBVoice
