= Microsoft Forms =

Cloud-based survey software

- Screenshot An example of a newly-created blank form in Microsoft Forms
- Developer: Microsoft
- Initial release: June 20, 2016; 9 years ago
- Platform: Web platform
- Predecessor: Microsoft InfoPath
- Type: Survey software
- Website: forms.microsoft.com

Microsoft Forms (formerly Office 365 Forms) is an online survey creator, part of Microsoft 365.

== Usage ==
Forms allows users to create surveys and quizzes with automatic marking.

The data can be exported to Microsoft Excel, Power BI dashboards and viewed live using the Present feature.

== Phishing and fraud ==
Due to a wave of phishing attacks utilizing Microsoft 365 in early 2021, Microsoft uses algorithms to automatically detect and block phishing attempts with Microsoft Forms.

Also, Microsoft advises Forms users not to submit personal information, such as passwords, in a form or survey. It also place a similar advisory underneath the “Submit” button in every form created with Forms, warning users not to give out their password.

== See also ==
- Google Forms
- Jotform
