= Computer-assisted survey information collection =

Computer-assisted survey information collection (CASIC) refers to a variety of survey modes that were enabled by the introduction of computer technology. The first CASIC modes were interviewer-administered, while later on computerized self-administered questionnaires (CSAQ) appeared. It was coined in 1990 as a catch-all term for survey technologies that have expanded over time.

== Modes ==
The most common modes of computer-assisted survey information collection, ranked by the extent of interviewer involvement, are:

1. CATI (Computer-assisted telephone interviewing) is the initial CASIC mode where a remotely present interviewer calls respondents by phone and enters the answers into a computerized questionnaire.
2. CAPI (Computer-assisted personal interviewing) was enabled by the introduction of portable computers where a physically present interviewer brings the computer with the questionnaire to the respondent and enters the answers into it.
3. CASI (Computer-assisted self-interviewing) is similar to CAPI but the respondent enters the answers on a computer of a physically present interviewer. Questions can also be presented in the form of audio (audio-CASI) or video clips (video-CASI).
4. CAVI (Computer-assisted video interviewing) is similar to CATI but the communication between a remotely present interviewer and the respondent is established via video chat.
5. Disk by mail includes a floppy or optical disk that is sent to the respondent. The interviewer is not present.
6. Touch-tone data entry (TDE) means that the respondent enters the answers by pressing the appropriate numeric keys on a telephone handset. The interviewer is not present.
7. Interactive voice response (IVR) includes a wide range of approaches for voice communication with a computer using the telephone. Modern speech recognition enabled IVR systems allow the respondent to provide complex answers through the telephone that are automatically recorded as text. The interviewer is not present.
8. Internet surveys include a variety of survey modes (e.g. mail, web) where the most widely used are web surveys. The interviewer is not present.
9. Virtual interviewer surveys are usually carried out via the Internet, where some kind of virtual interviewer introduces the questions to the respondent. Future technological developments will enable increased virtualization and interviewers will probably become completely computerized virtual characters. The interviewer is not present.

In addition, virtual-world interviews take place online in a space (such as Second Life) created for virtual interaction with other users or players. The interviewer and the respondent interact by a chat feature or by real voice audio and they each represent themselves through their avatars.

== Benefits ==
Benefits of CASIC include:

- Reduced time and costs for data input
- Elimination of errors during data transcription
- Implementation of advanced features, such as automatic skips and branching, randomization of questions and response options, control of answer validity, and inclusion of multimedia elements
- Increased sense of privacy for the respondent
- Reduced cost of research
- Higher data quality due to the absence of interviewer-related bias.

== See also ==
- Comparison of survey software
