= Epiphan Video =

Audiovisual equipment manufacturer

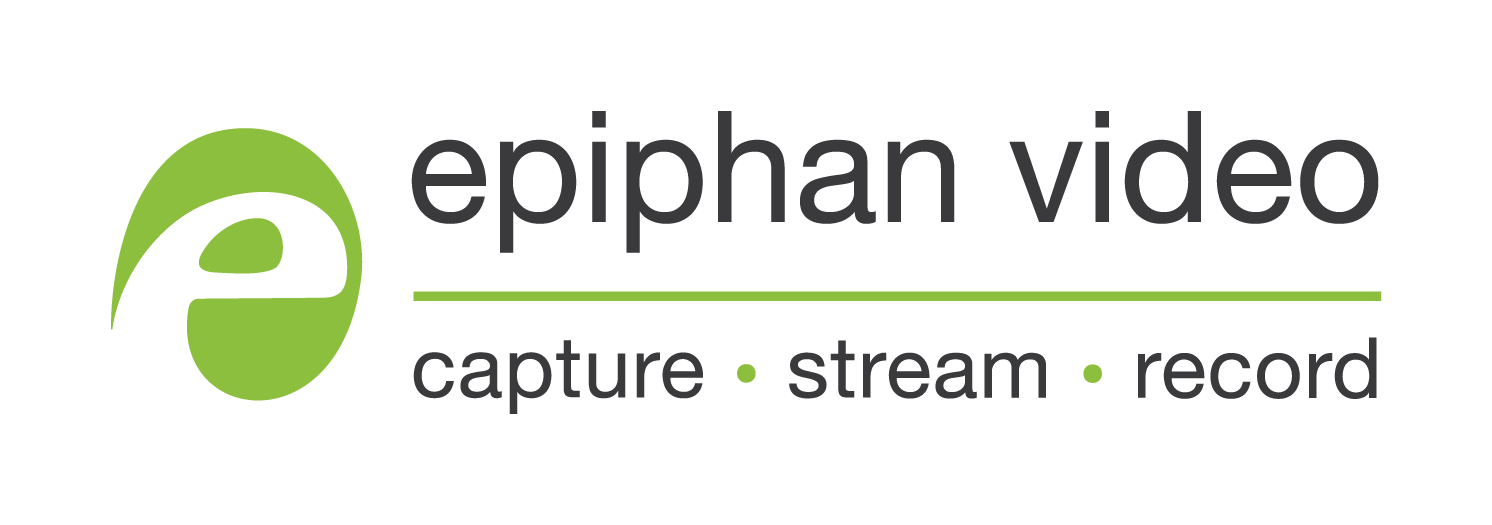
- Type: Private
- Industry: Computer hardware, Audiovisual
- Founded: Ottawa, Ontario (2003)
- Headquarters: Ottawa, Ontario, Canada
- Area served: Worldwide
- Key people: Mike Sandler, (CEO); Misha Jiline, (CTO)
- Website: www.epiphan.com

Epiphan Video, also known as Epiphan, is a privately held audiovisual equipment manufacturer. It is headquartered in Ottawa, Ontario, Canada with offices in Palo Alto and San Jose, California.

Epiphan Video markets, develops, manufactures, and supports a line of video capture, streaming, and recording products. Among their products are a family of high-resolution VGA, DVI, and HDMI frame grabbers (some with custom drivers, some UVC-based) and a series of professional AV streaming/recording systems with included video switching technology. Epiphan Video made the world's first high-resolution frame grabbers capable of transferring images over the USB bus with capture rates over 60 frames per second using precompressor technologies for image capture. YouTube lists Epiphan's Pearl-2 amongst its YouTube Live verified encoders.

Clients and integrators of Epiphan Video's technologies include the US Armed Forces, Microsoft, IBM, as well as a slate of other high-profile organizations. Its products are also used to relay images from medical equipment over the Internet. Epiphan's video broadcasting devices have also been used by NASA on the International Space Station for ultrasound remote diagnostics purposes.

Epiphan Systems was founded in 2003. As of 2020, it is a member of the SRT alliance.
