= GoCanvas =

- Company type: Private
- Founded: 2008; 18 years ago
- Headquarters: Reston, Virginia, USA
- Area served: Worldwide
- Services: Mobile application development
- Owner: K1 Investment Management; (2018-24); Nemetschek; (2024–present)
- Website: gocanvas.com

GoCanvas (previously known as Canvas) is a United States-based technology company which provides mobile apps and forms for data collection and sharing. The company's main offices are in Reston, Virginia, with a regional office in Sydney, Australia.

Founded in 2008, Canvas specializes in Software as a Service (SaaS). It achieved a first round of funding in 2011. In 2014, the company had 50 employees. It was acquired by private equity firm K1 Investment Management for more than $100 million at the end of 2018. In June 2024, Nemetschek announced that it has acquired GoCanvas for $770 million.

GoCanvas services provide mobile and tablet interfaces for filling out forms or collecting other data, which is then stored online, through a cloud model. Apps offered by the company allow businesses to decrease paper usage. MyCanvas is a service which allows access to data created by paid accounts, allowing, for example, a customer to review records they have submitted to a GoCanvas user.

GoCanvas allows users to customize their apps and can include GPS location capture, photos, signature capture, and reference data. Data can be exported in a comma-separated values spreadsheet or a pdf.

GoCanvas is a competitor of other digital forms providers such as Jotform, GoFormz, and Formstack.
