= Victor Canada =

Victor Canada (formerly ENCON Group Inc.)
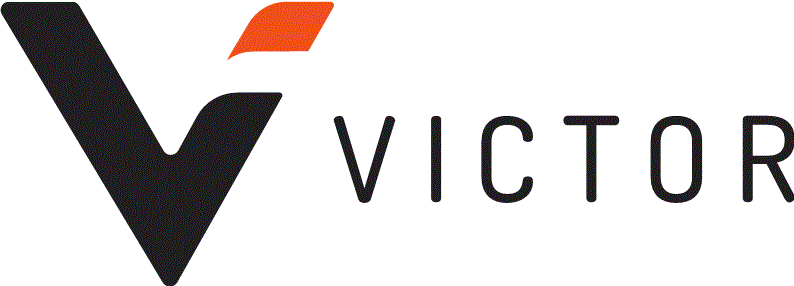
- Company type: Public
- Traded as: NYSE: MMC (under Marsh & McLennan Companies)
- Industry: Financial services
- Founded: 1962 (as Farquhar Bethune Insurance)
- Headquarters: 500-1400 Blair Towers Place; Ottawa, Ontario; K1J 9B8
- Key people: Dave Cook (President)
- Services: Professional Liability Insurance; Construction Insurance; Group & Retiree Benefits Programs
- Revenue: $320 million (2010)
- Number of employees: 230 (2019)
- Website: www.victorinsurance.ca

Victor Canada (formerly ENCON Group Inc.) is a Canadian managing general agent headquartered in Ottawa, Ontario, Canada with additional offices in Mississauga and Edmonton.

The company focuses on offering professional liability and construction insurance, as well as group and retiree benefits programs for individuals, professionals, organizations, and businesses. It develops, administers and distributes these programs through a nationwide network of independent plan advisors and brokers.

Victor Canada is a member of Victor Insurance Holdings – formerly known as The Schinnerer Group – and one of the largest managing general underwriters in the world.

== History ==
Victor Canada traces its history back to the establishment of Farquhar Bethune Insurance, founded in 1962 as a personal and commercial insurance agent.

In the decade following its foundation, the company introduced professional liability coverage for architects and engineers before establishing an engineered construction facility in 1970, thus creating the ENCON name, to underwrite property and liability insurance for construction risks. It subsequently developed a directors and officers program and errors and omissions coverage, further broadening its product base.

In 1986, it was acquired by Victor O. Schinnerer & Company, Inc. (now Victor), a U.S.-based underwriting management company and wholly owned subsidiary of Marsh & McLennan Companies Inc.

In 1994, Victor Canada’s product offerings were expanded to include group and retiree benefits.

== Products ==
Victor Canada provides liability insurance to architects and engineers, construction contractors, professionals involved in design-build projects, directors and officers, IT professionals, environmental consultants, land surveyors, landscape architects, and project managers, as well as errors and omissions insurance to associations and affinity groups, insurance brokers, legal professionals, financial professionals, medical professionals, and not-for-profit organizations.
