= Lumenera =

Lumenera Corporation, a division of Teledyne Technologies, Inc. is a developer and manufacturer of imaging devices such as digital cameras for industrial, scientific and surveillance applications. It further offers customization and original equipment manufacturer (OEM) services for specialized application.

It offers products featuring both CMOS and CCD sensors, equipped with USB, Ethernet and HDMI connections.
