= Wilderness Tours =

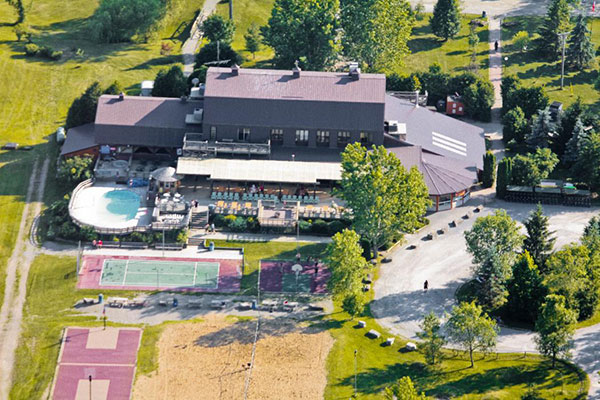
Wilderness Tours Resort

Wilderness Tours (WT) is a commercial whitewater rafting/kayaking and outdoor training center. It was founded in 1975 when Joe E. Kowalski and five others (Sean Mannion, Jimmy Casilio, Robbie Rosenberger, Ken Czambel and Paul Fogal) took rafts down and navigated the section of river known as Rocher-Fendu. Wilderness Tours is based in eastern Ontario near Ottawa, the capital city of Canada, on the Ottawa River. WT operates a variety of whitewater rafting and kayaking trips.

== Ottawa City Rafting ==
Wilderness Tours also owns a rafting company located beside Britannia Beach also on the Ottawa River just up river from Parliament Hill.

== Ottawa Kayak School ==
The kayak school that Wilderness Tours runs is called the Ottawa Kayak School (OKS) teaching beginners (with no experience necessary) to intermediate/advanced paddlers. It was started in 1982. OKS also runs premier programs which brings in kayakers from around the world both to teach and learn.

== River Run Rafting ==
In December 2015, Wilderness Tours acquired the River Run Whitewater Rafting company. River Run was founded in 1980 by Margaret Maloney and is also in the Ottawa Valley located on the Ottawa River. Their mission is to provide the best rafting experience on the Ottawa River, and to protect its natural splendor. The company also provides a paddler takeout (for a fee) that whitewater kayakers can use to set shuttles.

== Music festivals ==
Wilderness Tours has been host to many concerts such as Bud Camp (2006-2010), LogJam Country Music Festival (2014) and Kitchissippi Fest (2012-2014)

=== LogJam Fest ===
This country festival started two years after Wilderness Tours' Rock Festival, Kitchissippi Fest as a two-day event with Tebey headlining on Friday July 18 and Jason Blaine headlining on Saturday July 19.

=== Kitchissippi Fest ===
This rock festival was first started in 2012 on Saturday August 18 bringing headliners Swollen Members and Die Mannequin with supporting acts Ilvekyo, Trouble and Daughter, After party DJ HugsNotDrugs and festival DJ DJ-Atown. In 2013, the festival remained a one-day event on Saturday August with Hollerado headlining with supporting acts Mustapio Magical Murder, Trouble and Daughter, Ilvekyo, after party DJ HugsNotDrugs and Festival DJ Tom Thanks. In 2014, the festival grew to a 2-day event on Friday August 22 and Saturday August 23. The Sheepdogs headlined on Friday and the Arkells and Classified headlined on Saturday.

== World Freestyle Kayak Championships ==
Wilderness Tours has been the host to 3 world championships, the most recent in 2015 from Sept 1 to Sept 15 involving more than 40 countries
