= Level Platforms =

- Company type: Private company
- Industry: Managed services software
- Founded: Ottawa, Ontario (1999)
- Headquarters: Ottawa, Ontario
- Key people: Peter Sandiford; Founder, President and CEO
- Products: Managed Workplace
- Owner: Barracuda Networks
- Website: www.barracudamsp.com/products/rmm/barracuda-rmm

Level Platforms was a provider of remote monitoring and management (RMM) software products and services for managed services providers (MSPs), IT service providers and valued added resellers (VARs) that provide IT support services for small and medium size businesses (SMBs) and branch offices.

It was purchased by AVG Technologies in 2013, and was merged into the company.

== History ==
Level Platforms (LPI Level Platforms) was formed in 1999 as an international MSP serving SMBs. The company subsequently shifted its strategy to create the next generation of RMM software, releasing its initial Managed Workplace platform in May 2004.

On 12 June 2013, Level Platforms (LPI Level Platforms) was acquired by AVG Technologies. Level Platforms' founder Peter Sandiford left AVG in January 2014.

== Products ==
IT services providers in 30 countries around the world use Managed Workplace to deliver managed services to their small and midsized business customers. The software platform delivers integrated monitoring, management and automation capabilities, allowing service providers to manage all of their customers complete IT environments including computers, applications, security, IP telephony, cloud services and more from a single web-based dashboard. The software is provided in cloud and on-premises editions.

With Managed Workplace 2011, the company introduced features that allow MSPs to manage printers and imaging assets.

With the release of Managed Workplace 2012, Level Platforms introduced Mobile Device Management (MDM) capabilities that allow MSPs to monitor, configure and secure smartphones and tablets that run on operating systems from Apple, Google, Microsoft and RIM. MDM features, such as the ability to collect detailed asset information, remotely configure devices, track location and restrict user access if required, allow MSPs to address critical security and administration concerns for end-clients as sensitive corporate material is shared and accessed on mobile devices. In July 2012, Level Platforms introduced enhanced mobile device security capabilities, including the ability to automatically reset passwords, lock devices or wipe all information when a device is lost. In December 2012, the company announced that it was the first RMM vendor delivering MDM features for iPhone 5 and iOS 6.

Level Platforms also introduced white label Network Operations Center (NOC) and Help Desk Services, fully integrated in the Managed Workplace RMM platform, to allow MSPs to deliver 24x7x365 remediation and support offerings.

A number of corporations license Level Platforms OEM Cloud Edition software to provide a private labeled managed services platform to their channel partners including Hitachi Systems, Synnex and Intel.
