= Momentive =

American chemical company

Momentive Inc.
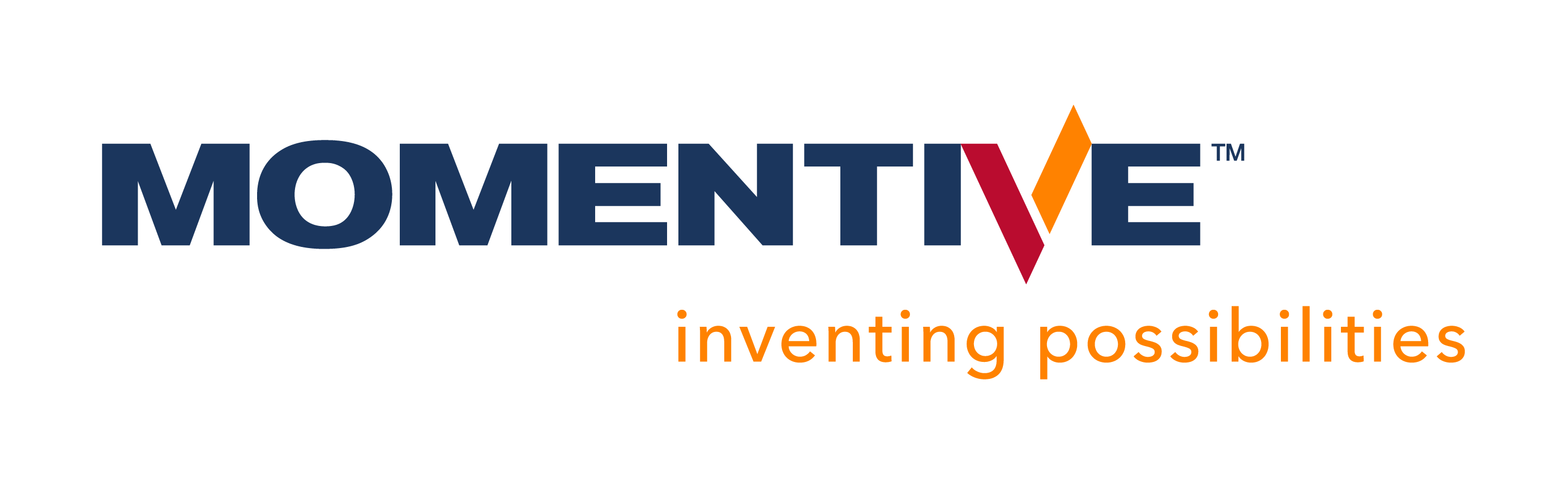
- Type: Subsidiary
- Industry: Chemicals
- Predecessor: Momentive Performance Materials Inc., Momentive Specialty Chemicals Inc.
- Founded: 1857
- Headquarters: Niskayuna, New York, United States
- Key people: Craig Borkowski (President & CEO)
- Revenue: $6.5 billion
- Owner: KCC Corporation; (2024–present)
- Number of employees: 9,200
- Parent: KCC Corporation
- Website: momentive.com

Momentive Performance Materials is an American multinational chemical company Headquartered in Niskayuna, New York, it employs 9,200 employees across more than 50 locations throughout North America, Europe, Asia and South America. With $6.5 billion in sales, the company was ranked as the 64th largest private company in the United States by Forbes in 2019. Momentive is the fourth-largest manufacturer in the Capital Region of New York State employing roughly 700 at its Waterford plant. As of 2024, Momentive is a fully owned subsidiary of KCC Corporation.

Momentive is one of the world’s largest producers of silicones and silicone derivatives. The company produces silicones, resins, specialty chemicals, siloxanes, silanes, additives, ceramics and quartz.

== History ==
The company traces its origins back to 1940, when General Electric research chemist Eugene G. Rochow, who first described the direct process for synthesizing silicone compounds. This breakthrough laid the foundation for commercial silicones, which over decades became used in myriad applications, from consumer goods through aerospace.

Momentive originated from General Electric’s silicones and advanced materials division, including associated joint ventures such as Bayer and Toshiba, which were active in the silicones and silanes sectors. General Electric established a large silicone production facility at Waterford, NY in 1947. At its peak in the 1960s and 1970s, the plant employed over 1,000 people and produced a range of silicone compounds for use in building materials, automotive components, aerospace applications, and cosmetics. In 2006, GE sold the facility to Apollo Global Management, after which it was renamed Momentive Performance Materials Inc. Under Apollo, Momentive drastically cut pay for most of its hourly employees and laid off dozens of hourly employees, a move which was tentatively ruled by the NLRB to be an illegal breach of contract. During and after this period, Pinkerton (detective agency) was hired by Apollo to assist Momentive's union-busting activities. The site continues to operate as a significant silicone manufacturing center. After bankruptcy in 2014, and a stock offering in 2017, the company is owned by a group of South Korean investors.

In November 2012, Momentive Performance Materials Inc. launched its Global Research and Development Center and regional business headquarters for India, Middle East, and Africa (IMEA) in Bangalore, India. The facility’s research scientists focus on developing new global technology platforms and products for both new and existing applications across a variety of industries, including personal care, energy, healthcare, electronics, automotive, and construction. Additionally, serving as Momentive’s regional headquarters, the site accommodates its commercial, business support, business process, and information technology operations.

In April 2013, Momentive Performance Materials Inc. expanded its Technology Center in Seoul, South Korea establishing a global innovation hub dedicated to the electronics sector. The upgraded Korea Technology Center (KTC), located in the Gasan Digital Complex and spanning over 1,500 m², integrates application development, R&D, testing, and manufacturing functions. Focused on advanced materials for display, LED, and OLED applications, the center strengthens company's regional presence and global innovation capabilities. In 2014, Momentive Performance Materials filed for Chapter 11 bankruptcy.

In February 2016, Momentive Performance Materials undertook a strategic expansion of its Leverkusen, Germany facility as part of its global initiative to enhance production capabilities for the automotive market. The company invested approximately $30 million to increase its silane manufacturing capacity at the site.

In April 2017, Momentive Performance Materials Inc. inaugurated a 20,000 sq ft research and development laboratory in Charlotte, North Carolina. The company invested approximately $3.5 million in this state-of-the-art facility, which focuses on testing and developing advanced compounds for leading tire manufacturers worldwide. Staffed by some of the industry’s top tire researchers, the lab serves as a global hub for the discovery and development of new materials.

In 2020, Momentive Performance Materials undertook a strategic realignment, investing $15 million to expand production of advanced electronic materials. During the same period, the company sold its consumer sealants business to Henkel and initiated a transition at its Waterford facility from manufacturing basic commodity chemicals to focusing on specialized applications, including advanced electronic materials. During this transition, silane production ceased permanently in Waterford resulting in the loss of roughly 300 jobs.

In November 2020, the company announced an investment of $13 million to expand its existing plant in Termoli, Italy. The expansion aims to establish a state-of-the-art manufacturing hub for Momentive’s polyurethane additives. The Termoli site, which produces high-performance additives for bedding, furniture, automotive, insulation, rigid foam applications as well as other silicone-based products, will undergo a comprehensive technology upgrade to broaden its capabilities, including serving the European slabstock foam industry.

In 2021, the company was assessed over $2 million in penalties by the New York State Department of Environmental Conservation as a result of air, water and hazardous waste law violations that had occurred at their Waterford facility since 2007.

In April 2024, it was announced that Korean-based KCC Corporation would fully acquire Momentive Performance Materials Group. The acquisition was completed in May 2024.

In October 2024, company opened a European Application Development Centre for Beauty and Personal Care in Abingdon, Oxfordshire, United Kingdom. The 300-square-metre facility includes the Haircare Centre of Excellence and the regional Application Development Team.The Haircare Centre of Excellence conducts performance testing to support the development of new raw materials for use in shampoos, Hair conditioner, conditioners, and leave-on cosmetics products. The facility is equipped with advanced laboratories and testing equipment, enabling evaluation of product attributes such as combability, heat protection, frizz reduction, and shine.

In February 2025, Momentive and Jiangxi Hungpai Material Co., Ltd., a silicon-based research and manufacturing leader in China announced the signing of a definitive agreement to establish a joint venture focused on the manufacturing, promotion, and sale of silanes in Asia.
