= SAW Video Mediatheque =

SAW Video Media Art Centre is an artist-run-centre for artistic production, presentation, and programming of independent video and media arts. SAW Video is based out of Ottawa, Ontario, Canada.

The SAW Video Mediatheque was the first online archive for independent media arts in Canada, soft-launched in 2003, and released publicly in 2004. The archive featured 496 videos, streamed in full for free on the Web. The Mediatheque suffered a back-end server crash and lost its database in 2009.

The archive was relaunched October 1, 2011 and continues to showcase over 300 videos.
