= Digital ink =

Digital ink is:

- Digital ink and paint, in animation

It may also refer to:

- Electronic paper
  - E-ink, a technology for electronic paper common in e-book readers
  - Windows Ink, a software suite for handwritten input in Microsoft products

== See also ==
- Active pen
- Digital pen
- Handwriting recognition
- Magnetic ink character recognition
- Pen computing
- Stylus (computing)
