= Formstack =

Workplace productivity platform

Formstack, LLC
- Industry: Software as a Service (SaaS)
- Founded: February 2006
- Founder: Ade Olonoh
- Headquarters: Fishers, Indiana, U.S.
- Key people: Aled Miles, CEO
- Number of employees: 250+
- Website: formstack.com

Formstack is a workplace productivity platform that lets organizations create digital workflows with no-code forms, documents, and signatures. Founded in 2006, the company was created by Ade Olonoh and serves over 25,000 organizations worldwide. On June 25, 2025, Formstack the company was officially rebranded as Intellistack. The new company has several product offerings including the Formstack product suite.

== History ==
Formstack was founded by Ade Olonoh on February 28, 2006. In November 2009, Formstack (then called FormSpring) launched formspring.me, a social question and answer site where users could ask questions, give answers, and learn more about their friends. Because of the success of the site, formspring.me was spun out as a separate company in January 2010 with a different team and different resources. To allow both companies to continue their growth, FormSpring.com became Formstack.com to avoid any confusion with formspring.me.

Originally created as an online form builder, Formstack has expanded its offerings to include data and workflow management for various industries, including healthcare, education, insurance, nonprofit, government, and finance. The company is headquartered in Indianapolis, IN with another office located in Colorado Springs, CO. Over half of Formstack's workforce works remotely in regions across the United States and around the world.

== Software and Services ==
Formstack enables organizations to create digital workflows without any programming or software skills required. Formstack users can collect data with online forms, generate digital documents, and gather electronic signatures.

The platform integrates with over 100 web applications, including apps for CRM management, email marketing, payment processing, and document management. Other product offerings include conversion rate optimization tools for marketers, workflow automation for Salesforce, and solutions for HIPAA compliance. Formstack is a competitor of other digital forms providers, like Jotform, GoCanvas, and GoFormz.

== Controversies ==
In May 2023, Formstack laid off over 100 of its employees; this reduction eliminated over 40% of its workforce. Chris Byers, the CEO of Formstack, announced the reduction in force on LinkedIn saying it was a "part of a larger plan to put Formstack in a place to continue to succeed and grow for the long term." Local news sources and prior employees note the reduction came approximately 18 months after Formstack had received a $425 million funding round from Silversmith Capital. To date, Byers has not provided a reason for nor a statement about the reduction in force. As a result of the layoffs, current and former employees expressed their grievances on Glassdoor en masse. As of September 2023, Formstack's approval rating on Glassdoor remained 2.5 stars out of 5, with only 21% of reviewers approving of Byers and being willing to recommend Formstack to a friend.
