= Jotform =

American company

Jotform, Inc.
- Logo since 2021
- Company type: Private company
- Available in: 18 languages
- Founded: 2006
- Headquarters: San Francisco, California, U.S.
- Area served: Worldwide
- Founder: Aytekin Tank
- Industry: SaaS / Online Data Collection
- Products: Online form builder, online survey tool, no-code app builder, electronic signature software
- Employees: 856 (2025)
- Website: www.jotform.com

Jotform is a San Francisco–based company for building online forms. Founded in 2006 by Aytekin Tank, Jotform also offers a mobile app builder, a PDF editor, and electronic signature collection services. As of February 2025, it has more than 35 million users.

== History ==
Jotform was founded in 2006 by Aytekin Tank.

In 2011, it released Wishbox, a feedback tool that annotates screenshots.

By 2012, Jotform had over 700,000 users and published over two million user forms.

In February 2012, the United States Secret Service shut down the Jotform site as part of a concealed investigation of user-created forms. After two days, it was back online.

Jotform released an Adobe Document Cloud eSign Widget in June 2015 for embedded e-signing into forms.

In April 2016, Jotform announced that its software was available on Weebly. In December 2016, the company partnered with IFTTT to integrate an "Applet" to create forms in other applications. Tech Times recognized Jotform's integration on Slack as one of the "Best Productivity Apps" of 2016.

In 2018, Jotform acquired Noupe, an online magazine.

In October 2021, on the occasion of the 15th anniversary of its founding, Jotform has undergone a major rebranding. That rebranding included the changes in its logo, color palette, along with the change in the brand name from JotForm to Jotform.

== Software ==
Jotform offers its customers a drag-and-drop form builder in which the users are able to customize anything related to the form. Conditional logic can also be set. The product also integrates with many other major software tools.

In addition to being a form builder, Jotform has produced other products, such as Jotform Apps in 2021, a no-code app builder, and Jotform Sign in 2022, an electronic signature collection tool. In September 2023, Jotform became available on the Salesforce AppExchange platform. In October 2024, Jotform launched its workflow builder product Jotform Workflows. In February 2025, Jotform launched its AI solution Jotform AI Agents, where users can build their own AI agents.

== Locations ==
In addition to the headquarters of the company in San Francisco, there are seven Jotform offices throughout the world: Four are located in Turkey (two in Ankara and one each in İzmir and Istanbul), along with offices in London, Vancouver and Sydney.
