= Tundra Semiconductor =

Semiconductor company in Canada

Tundra Semiconductor Corp.
- Type: Public
- Industry: System Interconnect
- Founded: Ottawa, Ontario (1983)
- Defunct: 2009
- Fate: Acquired by [[Integrated Device Technology|]]
- Headquarters: Ottawa, Ontario
- Key people: Adam Chowaniec Chairman; Daniel Hoste CEO; David Long CFO
- Products: RapidIO Switches, PCI/PCI-X/PCI Express Bridges, HyperTransport bridges, VME bridges, Host bridges for Power ISA processors, Power Controllers, Design services and IP
- Number of employees: ~240 (Q3 2009)
- Website: www.tundra.com (defunct)

Tundra Semiconductor Corporation was a company headquartered in Ottawa, Ontario, Canada. It was acquired by Integrated Device Technology in 2009. Which itself was acquired Renesas Electronics.

Tundra supplied communications, computing and storage companies with System Interconnect products, intellectual property (IP) and design services backed by customer service and technical support. Tundra's track record included bridges and switches for industry standards: RapidIO, PCI, PCI-X, PCI Express, Power ISA, VME, HyperTransport, Interlaken, and SPI4.2. Tundra's products enabled board design and layout, with specific focus on system level signal integrity. Tundra's design services division, Silicon Logic Engineering, Inc., offered ASIC and FPGA design services, semiconductor intellectual property and product development consulting.

Tundra had design centers in North America: Ottawa, Eau Claire, Wisconsin and in Hyderabad, India. Its sales offices were located in Europe, and throughout North America, and Asia Pacific.

In 2004, Tundra joined with IBM and others to form Power.org, an organization devoted to drive development and adaptation of Power ISA computers.

== History ==
Although Tundra was incorporated as an entity in 1995, its history goes back to 1983 as Calmos Semiconductor, which was subsequently acquired in 1989 by Newbridge Networks Corporation, where it became known as Newbridge Microsystems and in 1995 was spun out as Tundra Semiconductor. In June 2009 Tundra was acquired by IDT.

=== Calmos ===
Former MicroSystems International and Mosaid employee John Roberts founded Calmos Microsystems in April 1983. The company was initially run out of his home in Kanata and moved to a facility on Edgewater Road in Kanata once the company had raised $800,000 in funds.

The company originally planned to design and produce gate array integrated circuits, or chips, for Canadian and U.S. customers. During the design phase, the market dried up and forced the company to focus on developing application-specific circuits. These application-specific circuits would later be incorporated into a larger circuits for other applications. It ended up being a profitable niche that saw the company through the early 1980s memory market slump.

By October 1985, Calmos had raised additional funds, bringing the total to $1.4 million, had grown to 15 employees and had yearly revenue of $1.5 Million. In order to increase sales and grow the business, John Roberts looked for a CEO with experience in the U.S. semiconductor market. Adam Chowaniec, who had left Commodore International's Semiconductor division was brought on board as President, while John Roberts became the Executive VP of R&D.

=== Newbridge Microsystems ===
Newbridge Networks primarily acquired Calmos Microsystems for its single chip high-speed public key data encryption system, which became a selling point for Newbridge Networks systems to the U.S. federal government. The rest of the original Calmos Product line though revenue generating and profitable was not a major reason for the acquisition, these products continued to be sources of revenue well after the division was spun out as Tundra, most notably this include the 8085 variant which was sold as late as 1999.

In December 1995, Newbridge Microsystems assets were sold to a new corporate entity known as Tundra Semiconductor.

=== Newbridge Affiliate ===
At the time of the Tundra spun out the company raised $10 Million (CDN) in third-party investment from Venture Capital Funds and Mutual funds, Terry Matthews also made a personal investment and Newbridge retained a 38% ownership in the new entity meaning Tundra Semiconductor became a member of the Newbridge affiliate program. A benefit of the spin out from direct Newbridge Networks ownership was that Tundra was now free to sell to Newbridge competitors

In 1997, Canadian Industry Minister John Manley announced that Tundra Semiconductor would receive a $400,000 loan for R&D use. Chowaniec stated to a Rideau Club luncheon that Tundra had $11 million in revenue in 1996 and expected to generate $20 million or $21 million in revenue achieve profitability in 1997 and hoped to increase sales revenues by another 50 per cent in 1998. He also made reference to the fact that the company was having difficulty in recruiting the talent it needed to move the company forward with about 20 positions for engineers that were unfilled. The company employee count during this period grew from 50 to 70.

== Technology and Innovation ==
In early 1990, Newbridge Microsystems licensed DY4 VME Interface Chip Set. This became the beginning of the companies involvement in system interconnect development that Tundra was later to become a leader in. At about this time Calmos Founder John Roberts left the company to become C.E.O. of the Strategic Microelectronics Consortium and later founded another startup SiGe Microsystems which also spunout Sigem.

In 1994 Newbridge Microsystems also developed the SPRITE T1, the first T1 Wide Area Network access card for a Sun Microsystems Computer Co. Netra Internet Server. SPRITE T1 was an SBus card that enabled full T1 WAN service directly in to a Sun Netra Internet Server. By early 1995 Newbridge Microsystems had announced a strategic relationship with Motorola Inc. for the development of a PCI to 68K bridge product family. This was to be the beginning of a long partnership between Newbridge Microsystems (Tundra) and Motorola which continues today with Tundra's PowerPC system products.

== Acquisitions ==
In February 1988 the company acquired the integrated circuit division of Siltronics for $500,000. The purchase brought with it revenue of $2 to $3 million and all of the inventory, machinery, customer lists and unfilled orders for Siltronics's bipolar integrated circuit product line. Calmos also hired 24 of the existing Siltonics staff including founder and vice-president Gyles Panther, doubling the size of Calmos's workforce. Later that year Federal Industry Minister Michel Côté announced that Calmos had won a $3.07 million Canadian Federal grant to work with European Silicon Structures of Bracknell, England for joint development of Applications Specific Integrated Circuits (ASIC.) At about this time the company grew to include an assembly plant located in Nepean, on Stafford Road.

In March 1989 Calmos acquired UltraMac Conversions which designed and manufactured peripherals for Apple's Macintosh computers, which subsequently operated under the name Calmos Data, the group was headed by the former president Lincoln Henthorn. By May Calmos Microsystems had grown to 55 employees, was profitable and had sales of over $4.5 million. Newbridge Networks, a Calmos customer and founded by Welsh entrepreneur Terry Matthews, who had also attended university with founder John Roberts, acquired the company. Newbridge was private at the time and subsequently went public that June, financial terms were not disclosed at the time. However, in a 1997 Ottawa Citizen interview John Roberts stated that Calmos was purchased for $5 million in Newbridge Pre-IPO shares that subsequently became worth "about $100 Million."

Tundra acquired a South Portland, Maine-based chip developer for $45 million (U.S.) 90 per cent in stock and the balance in cash. Quadic Systems Inc had a relationship with Tundra, from providing expertise in the design of Tundra's recently released PowerPro and upcoming Tsi920 semiconductors. Former Quadic president David Ferris became vice president of the South Portland operation which had at the time of acquisition 37 employees.

In September 2003 Tundra bought the MPC1xx family northbridge controllers for the PowerPC 7xx and 7xxx microprocessors from Motorola, which it now produces under the brand name Tsi1xx.

== IPO & public company ==
The company held its first AGM on October 20, 1997 where Adam Chowaniac stated the company's intention to go public in 12–18 months. However, Tundra's hopes to go public in 1998 were dashed by the Asian financial crisis that also affected the stock markets. Although this complicated their future growth plans, Tundra continued to grow from its profits and through the continued support of its private investors. Part of this continued growth was the opening of a Mountain View office for sales and customer support.

The company began trading on Monday, February 8, 1999 on the Toronto Stock Exchange. The Shares placement was at $9.25 but the shares were in such demand that they opened well above this price at $13.10 and closed their first day of trading at $13.24." The IPO also allowed Newbridge Networks to sell a portion of its ownership, cutting it from 37% to 17%. By march the company announced that its stake had fallen to 10.3%. By September 1999 the companies had completed a secondary offering of one million shares for $15.6 million and the stock was trading at $17.25. The company also announced plans to move into a mixed-retail and office space campus in the Kanata Centrum Area which never came to fruition.

In February 2000 the company recorded revenues of $10.435 million and earnings of $1.222 million (eight cents a share) in the third fiscal quarter ended Jan. 30, compared with $7.311 million in revenue and $539,000 earnings (five cents a share) for the same 1999 period. The stock subsequently hit a new all-time high of $51.75. The company had an internal goal of becoming a billion dollar company in revenue by 2008. At the time the company expected revenue growth to stay at 20 to 50% annually "for the next couple years", according to an interview with Adam Chowaniac.

Tundra shares, buoyed by excellent third-quarter results in late February, hit an all-time intraday high of $78 on March 8, 2000. In late April the company was added to the TSE 300 Composite, the TSE 200, and the Standard and Poor/TSE Canadian SmallCap Indices. For the fiscal year ended April 30, 2000, revenue was $40.672 million, up 46 per cent from $27.809 million the year before. Earnings for the year were $4.614 million, or 31 cents per fully diluted share, a 111% gain over the $2.184 million, or 19 cents per share.

At about this time R&D initiatives that had been in the pipeline from the IPO funding started to come online. Tundra announced the deployment of a multi-port bus switch called the PowerSpan, which the company claimed was the industry's first multi-port PowerPC-to-PCI Bus Switch. While the bulk of sales came from existing VME and QSpan products, the PowerSpan and the TSI 920 (A voice signals to digital messages converter), were expected to start contributing significant revenue number in the next fiscal year.
