= Canadian industrial research and development organizations =

Expenditures by Canadian corporations on research and development accounted for about 50% of all spending on scientific research and development in Canada in 2007.

In the corporate sector research and development tends to focus on the creation or invention of new products and services or more commonly the incremental improvement of existing products and services. A good example of the former would be the invention of the BlackBerry, by the Waterloo, Ontario-based company, Research in Motion, while an example of the latter would be the development of a new class of aircraft, the regional jet by Bombardier Aerospace of Montreal, Quebec.

It is rare for corporations to undertake what might be considered "pure" scientific research. In almost all cases the corporate bottom line is a paramount consideration and the payoff for such activity is not usually immediately evident. However it is true that there are times when the difference between the two is not at all clear, as was the case for example, with atomic research at Chalk River, Ontario, during World War II and in the post war years, which led to the development of the CANDU power reactor. More recently, research in the field of nanotechnology blurs the distinction as well. Is investigation into the principles of the manipulation of atoms science or engineering?

In 2006, preliminary data indicates total spending on scientific and industrial research in Canada amounted to C$28.067 billion or almost 2 percent of GDP. In 2006, Canadian corporations spent C$14.858 billion on research and development, representing about half of all R&D spending in Canada and about one percent of Canada's GDP.

In 2007, preliminary data indicates total spending on scientific and industrial research in Canada amounted to C$28.94 billion or almost 2 percent of GDP. In 2007, Canadian corporations spent C$15.773 billion on research and development, again representing about half of all R&D expenditures in Canada and an amount equal to about one percent of the GDP.

Below is a list of the largest corporate R&D spenders in Canada ranked by size. Also described are sectorial R&D expenditures for the 2006 fiscal year. A section that lists some important government R&D funding agencies is also included.

== Largest Canadian corporate research and development spenders ==
- Canada's ICT Top Corporate R&D Spenders 2005 Fiscal Year (in US$ millions)
  - Nortel Networks Corporation* 1,855.9 Comm/telecom equipment
  - Bell Canada 1,436.0 Telecommunications services
  - ATI Technologies Inc.* 372.5 Computer equipment
  - IBM Canada Ltd. (fs) 283.1 Software and computer services
  - Ericsson Canada Inc. (fs) 165.9 Comm/telecom equipment
  - Alcatel Canada Inc. (fs) 160.1 Comm/telecom equipment
  - Cognos Incorporated* 106.0 Software & computer services
  - Telus Corporation 103.2 Telecommunications services
  - Research In Motion Limited* 101.2 Comm/telecom equipment
  - PMC Sierra, Ltd. (fs) 85.1 Electronic parts and components
  - Zarlink Semiconductor Inc.* 65.2 Comm/telecom equipment
  - Open Text Corporation* 65.1 Software & computer services
  - CGI Group Inc. 64.5 Software & computer services
  - Geac Computer Corporation Limited*+ 57.9 Software & computer services
  - Hummingbird Ltd.* 46.4 Software & computer services
  - Aastra Technologies Limited 43.2 Comm/telecom equipment
  - Motorola Canada Limited (fs) 42.1 Comm/telecom equipment
  - Mitel Networks Corporation* 41.4 Comm/telecom equipment
  - Source: RESEARCH Infosource Inc., Canada's Top 100 Corporate R&D List, 2006 (2/2007)
- Canada's Life Sciences Top Corporate R&D Spenders 2005 Fiscal Year (in US$ Millions)
  - Apotex Inc. 151.1
  - Pfizer Canada Inc. (fs) 147.5
  - GlaxoSmithKline Inc. (fs) 111.8
  - Merck Frosst Canada Ltd. (fs) 96.6
  - Biovail Corporation* 88.9
  - AstraZeneca Canada Inc. (fs) 79.8
  - Sanofi Pasteur Limited (fs) 76.6
  - QLT Inc.* 74.6
  - MDS Inc. 71.8
  - Sanofi-aventis Canada Inc. (fs) 59.6
  - Vasogen Inc. 59.1
  - Novartis Pharmaceuticals Canada Inc. (fs) 53.6
  - Wyeth Pharmaceuticals (fs) 50.0
  - Neurochem Inc. 41.7
  - Source: RESEARCH Infosource Inc., Canada's Top 100 Corporate R&D List, 2006 (2/2007)
- Canada's Aerospace Top Corporate R&D Spenders 2005 Fiscal Year (in US$ Millions)
  - Pratt & Whitney Canada Corp. (fs) 389.5
  - Bombardier Inc.* 175.0
  - CAE Inc. 88.8
  - Honeywell Canada (fs) 76.0
  - MacDonald, Dettwiler and Associates Ltd. 40.4
  - Source: RESEARCH Infosource Inc., Canada's Top 100 Corporate R&D List, 2006 (2/2007)
- Canada's Energy, Oil and Gas Top Corporate R&D Spenders 2005 Fiscal Year (in US$ Millions)
  - Atomic Energy of Canada Limited 218.0
  - Suncor Energy Inc. 89.1
  - EnCana Corporation* 80.0
  - Ballard Power Systems Inc.* 75.5
  - Imperial Oil Limited 56.1
  - Syncrude Canada Ltd. 36.6
  - Source: RESEARCH Infosource Inc., Canada's Top 100 Corporate R&D List, 2006 (2/2007)

== Industrial research and development expenditures by sector ==
- Canadian Gross Expenditure on R&D (GERD) by Performing Sectors - 2006 Estimates
  - C$ Millions
  - Business Enterprises 14,850, 52.4%
  - Higher Education 10,890, 38.4%
  - Federal Government 2,145, 7.6%
  - Provincial Government 345, 1.2%
  - Provincial Research Organizations 127, 0.4%
  - Total 28,357, 100.0%
  - Source: Statistics Canada, Science Statistics September 2006 (2/2007)
- Canadian Industrial Intramural R&D Expenditures, Selected Industries - 2006 Estimates
  - C$ Millions
  - Machinery 488
  - Motor Vehicles and parts 537
  - Wholesale Trade 767
  - Semiconductor & other electronic components 869
  - Aerospace products and parts 912
  - Computer system design & related services 1,056
  - Scientific research & development services 1,142
  - Pharmaceutical & medicine 1,293
  - Information & cultural industries 1,518
  - Communication Equipment 1,580
  - Source: Statistics Canada, Science Statistics September 2006 (2/2007)
- Canadian Industrial Intramural R&D Expenditures in Six Sub-group - 2006 Estimates
  - Agriculture, forestry, fishing and hunting 80
  - Mining and oil and gas extraction 261
  - Utilities 197
  - Construction 46
  - Manufacturing 8,273
    - Communication Equipment 1,580
    - Pharmaceutical & medicine 1,293
    - Aerospace products and parts 912
    - Semiconductor & other electronic components 869
    - Motor Vehicles and parts 537
    - Machinery 488
    - Paper 468
    - Navig., measuring, medical & control instruments 345
    - Other manufacturing industries 1,781
  - Services 5,993
    - Information and cultural industries 1,518
    - Scientific research & development services 1,142
    - Computer system design & related services 1,056
    - Wholesale Trade 767
    - Architectural, engineering and real estates 442
    - Health care and social assistance 364
    - Finance, insurance and real estate 356
    - All other services 348
  - Total All Industries 14,850
  - Source: Statistics Canada, Science Statistics August 2006 (2/2007)

== Government industrial research and development funding agencies ==
- Revenue Canada - Ottawa, Ontario
  - Scientific Research and Experimental Development Programme,
    - Federal government tax advantages for industrial research and development.
- National Research Council of Canada - Ottawa, Ontario
  - NRC Industrial Research Assistance Program (NRC-IRAP)- Ottawa (Montreal Road Campus), Ontario and NRC-IRAP across Canada,
- Ontario Ministry of Research and Innovation - Toronto, Ontario
  - Commercialization and Funding Organizations
    - Early Researcher Awards
    - The Health Technology Exchange
    - Innovation Demonstration Fund
    - International Strategic Opportunities Program
    - Ontario Commercialization Investment Funds
    - Ontario Fuel Cell Innovation Programme
    - Ontario Research Commercialization Program
    - Premiers Discovery Awards
- Government of Newfoundland and Labrador
  - The Research and Development Corporation

== See also ==
- Canadian government scientific research organizations
- Canadian university scientific research organizations
- Science and technology in Canada
