= MKC =

MKC may refer to:

== Transportation ==
- Charles B. Wheeler Downtown Airport, serving Kansas City, Missouri (IATA airport code)
- Maksi Junction railway station (Indian Railways code: MKC), Madhya Pradesh, India
- Milton Keynes Central railway station (UK National Rail station code)
- Lincoln MKC, Lincoln automobile
- Chief Machinery Technician, a rating in the US Coast Guard

== Other uses ==
- McCormick & Company (NYSE ticker symbol)
- Meserete Kristos Church, an Ethiopian Anabaptist denomination
- MKC Networks, a Canadian VoIP company
- Mortal Kombat: Conquest, a television show based on the video game Mortal Kombat
