= PACX =

Family of data switching products

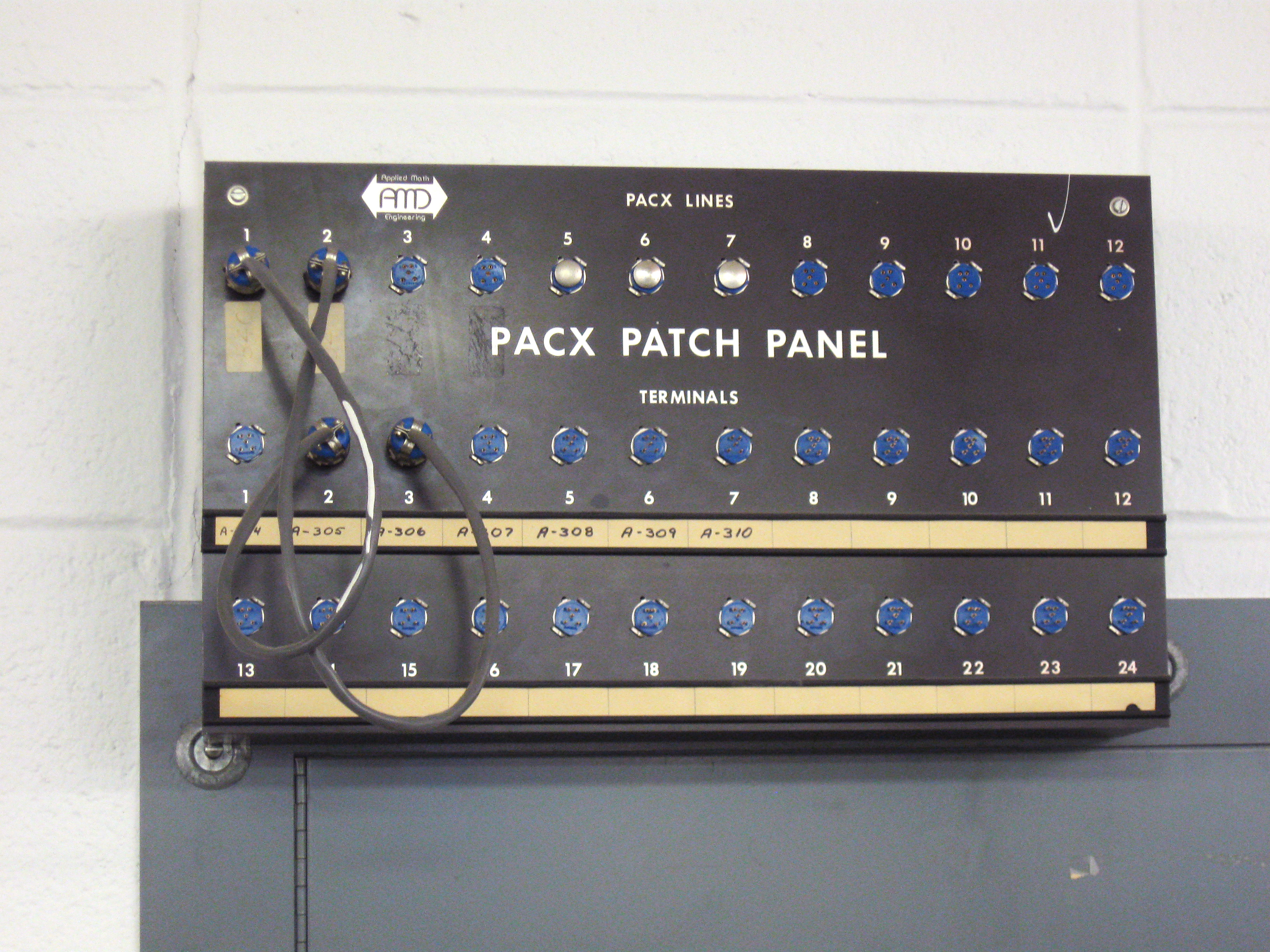
A PACX Patch Panel

PACX (Private Automatic Computer eXchange) was a name given by Gandalf Technologies to their family of data switching products.

== Architecture ==
The PACX was a centralized switch that allowed serial connections from end users to be connected to any one of a number of computers, typically mainframes. Users were equipped with small boxes with two thumbwheels on them, and by rolling the wheels to a given two-digit number they could select among the machines connected to the PACX. In typical setups, the PACX would be connected to computer terminals or modems. The switch box would be queried on connection for the user's selection, and then a direct connection would be made between the user and that machine. The system was not unlike the telephone network, and the name PACX was deliberately chosen to suggest a computer-side analog of the PABX market.

== Background ==
The PACX, with its mainframe utility, was part of an era in which enterprise data services were seen to the province of an Office Controller. The Office Controller was envisaged as a central switch which would interconnect and create all applications and make them available to users. PABX manufacturers of that era (the 1980s) created suites of data applications for the connection of users to mainframe applications. There were even magazine articles touting the victory of the PABX as an Office Controller over its LAN rivals. The PACX was a data PABX without the voice capability.

With the development of LANs and cheap PCs with their attendant client/server applications, the Office Controller vision faded away. However the idea is not without merit. It is being re-established in new guises with the development of SIP with Session Border Controllers and Service Oriented Architectures.
