= Microsystems International =

Microsystems International Limited
- Company type: Subsidiary
- Industry: Semiconductor; Telecommunications
- Founded: 1969; 56 years ago in Ottawa, Ontario, Canada
- Defunct: 1974; 51 years ago
- Fate: Folded into Bell-Northern Research
- Parent: Northern Electric

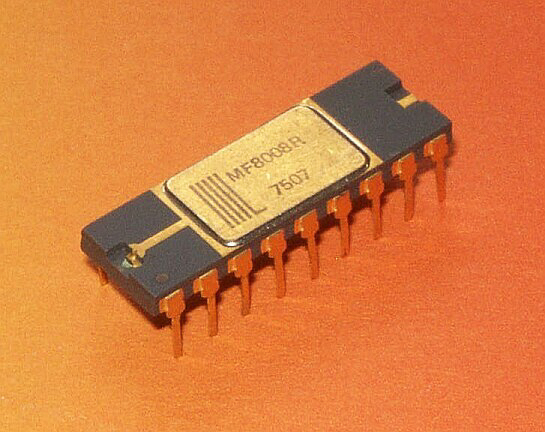
MIL MF8008R 8-bit microprocessor, second source of the Intel 8008

Microsystems International Limited (MIL) was a telecommunications microelectronics company based in Ottawa, Ontario, Canada, founded in 1969. MIL was an early attempt to create a merchant semiconductor house by Nortel Networks (then Northern Electric).

MIL is historically important as the producers of one of the world's earliest microprocessors, the MIL MF7114, which was based on the design of the Intel 4004. MIL also produced a series of early microcomputers using this chip, including the MIL CPS-1, which may be the earliest example of a microcomputer system that was shipped in completed form, as opposed to a kit that had to be assembled. Several other upgraded models followed.

== History ==
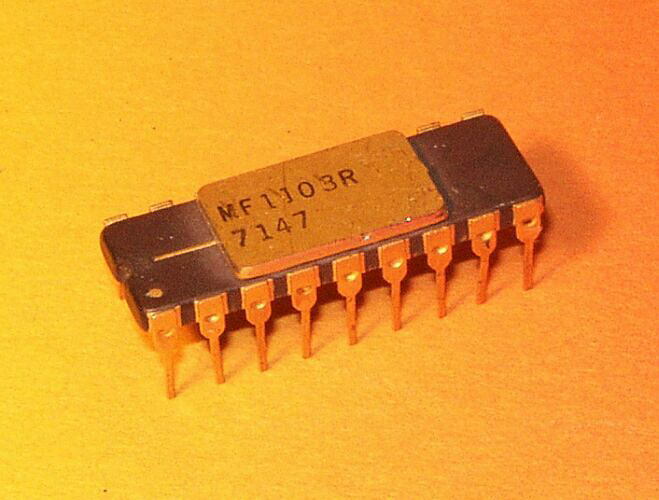
MIL MF1103R 1 kb PMOS DRAM, second source of the Intel 1103

Electronic manufacturers were at that time forced to create custom integrated circuits due to the lack of industry standard ICs. MIL was an attempt to create a merchant company that could supply such standard devices as well as custom devices for Northern Electric products. Northern Electric entered the field partly at the urging of the Canadian federal government even though it had strong doubts of the viability of the company.

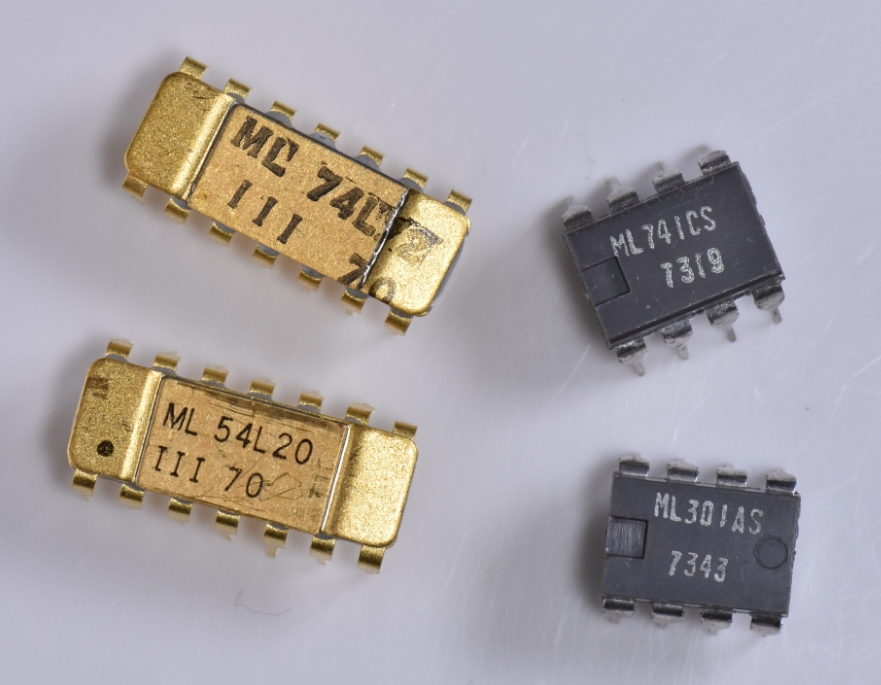
MIL standard bipolar digital TTL logic (ML54L20, ML74L72) and linear opamp (ML301, ML741) components

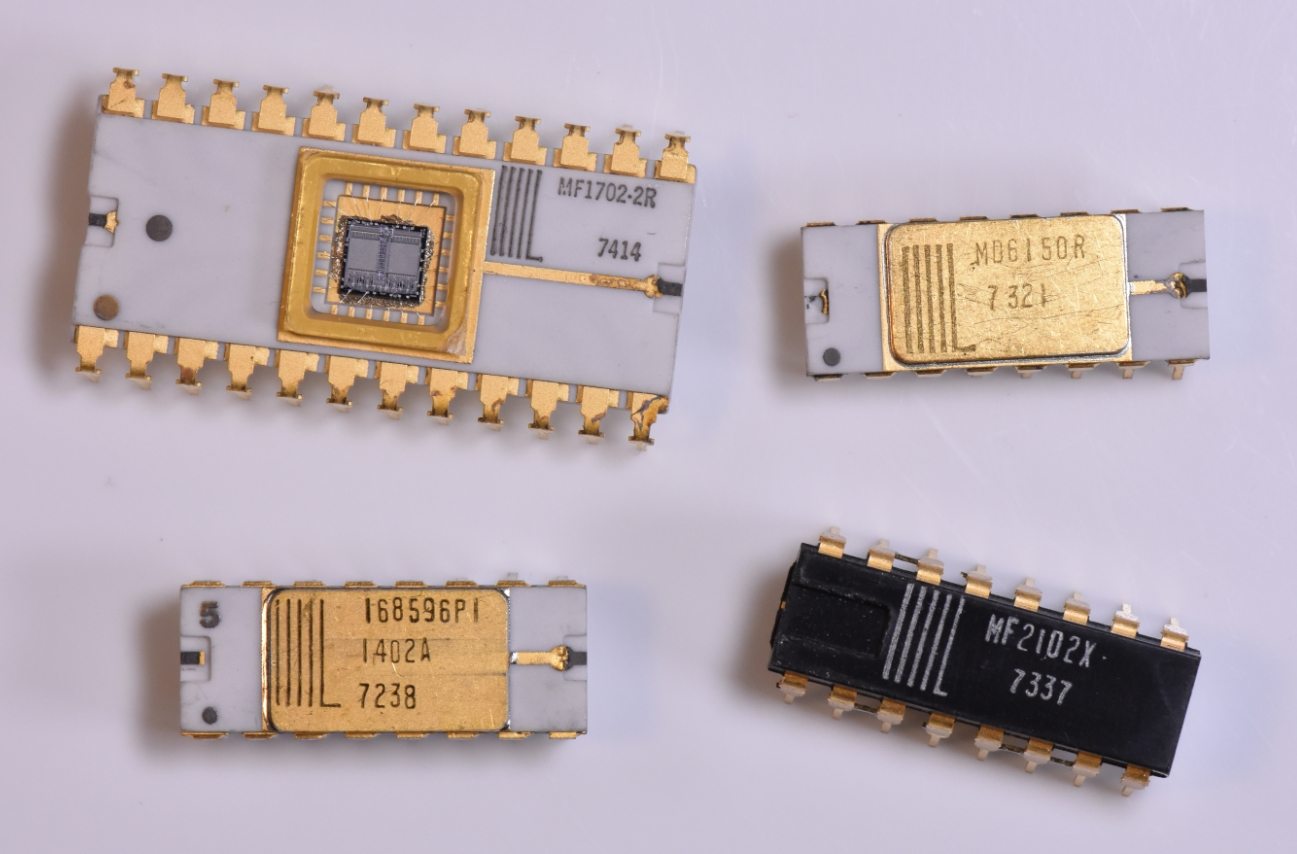
MIL MF1702 2kb EPROM, MD6150 256b bipolar SRAM, MF1402 1kb dynamic shift register, and MF2102 1kb NMOS SRAM

MIL manufactured both bipolar and MOS semiconductor devices, including standard TTL digital logic components and linear products such as operational amplifiers, as well as a variety of memory components. In 1971, MIL became a second source for the Intel 1103 DRAM IC. The licensing fee paid by MIL to Intel meant that Intel could show a profit in 1971 for the first time in its history.

MIL was never able to show a profit and losses were exacerbated by the semiconductor market downturn in 1974. It was purchased and folded into Nortel's research arm Bell-Northern Research and later merged into Nortel. MIL was purchased and folded into Nortel's research arm Bell-Northern Research in 1974. The MIL fabrication facility continued to operate as the largest semiconductor fab in Canada until Nortel's bankruptcy in 2009.

== Spinoffs ==
MIL's most lasting contribution is that it was the meeting place for the entrepreneurs Terry Matthews and Michael Cowpland. The pair left the company to found much of the high tech industry in Kanata, Ontario, Canada. They started Mitel together. Cowpland later started Corel. Matthews later started Newbridge Networks. Cowpland's boss at MIL cautioned him against leaving the security of a large company just a few months before MIL was wound up.

Another partnership formed at MIL was that of Dick Foss and Bob Harland who, on their return from the 1975 ISSCC conference where they had presented their paper on MIL's 4k DRAM, found that they were no longer employed. They started MOSAID initially as a memory design house and branched out into other related areas such as reverse engineering, EDA software, and memory test equipment manufacturing. The reverse engineering business was spun off in 1989 as Semiconductor Insights, now TechInsights.
