= Zarlink =

Semiconductor Company

Zarlink Semiconductor Inc. (in last years as an independent company)
- Industry: Semiconductors
- Successor: Microsemi
- Headquarters: Ottawa, Ontario, Canada
- Number of employees: 500
- Website: www.zarlink.com

Zarlink Semiconductor (acquired by Microsemi in October 2011, itself acquired by Microchip in March 2018) was a fabless semiconductor company specializing in the design and manufacture of communication and medical semiconductor integrated circuits, modules, and other devices. In 2011, Microsemi acquired Zarlink in a hostile takeover and merged it into its own operations.

In its last years as an independent entity, the company's core capabilities were in network timing, voice enhancement and ultra low-power wireless communication. Its head offices were located in Ottawa, Canada. Zarlink sold products to 3,000 customers in more than 100 countries. In 2011, it had approximately 500 employees worldwide, including in development centres in Canada and the U.S., and specialized fabrication facilities in Wales. Essentially all of its manufacturing was done off-shore through subcontracting partners.

== History ==
=== Early history ===
Zarlink was part of Mitel Corporation which was founded by Terry Matthews and Michael Cowpland in 1973. In 1982 the company developed the industry's first T1/E1 framer chip and later introduced the industry's first echo cancellation chip in 1996.

In 1998, Mitel acquired GEC-Plessey Semiconductor in the UK from the General Electric Company for US$225 million in cash, through which it gained wireless technology and communications ASIC and systems integration expertise, including RF (Radio Frequency) technology. The combined semiconductor businesses at the time ranked Mitel among the top ten networking companies in the world.

=== 21st century ===
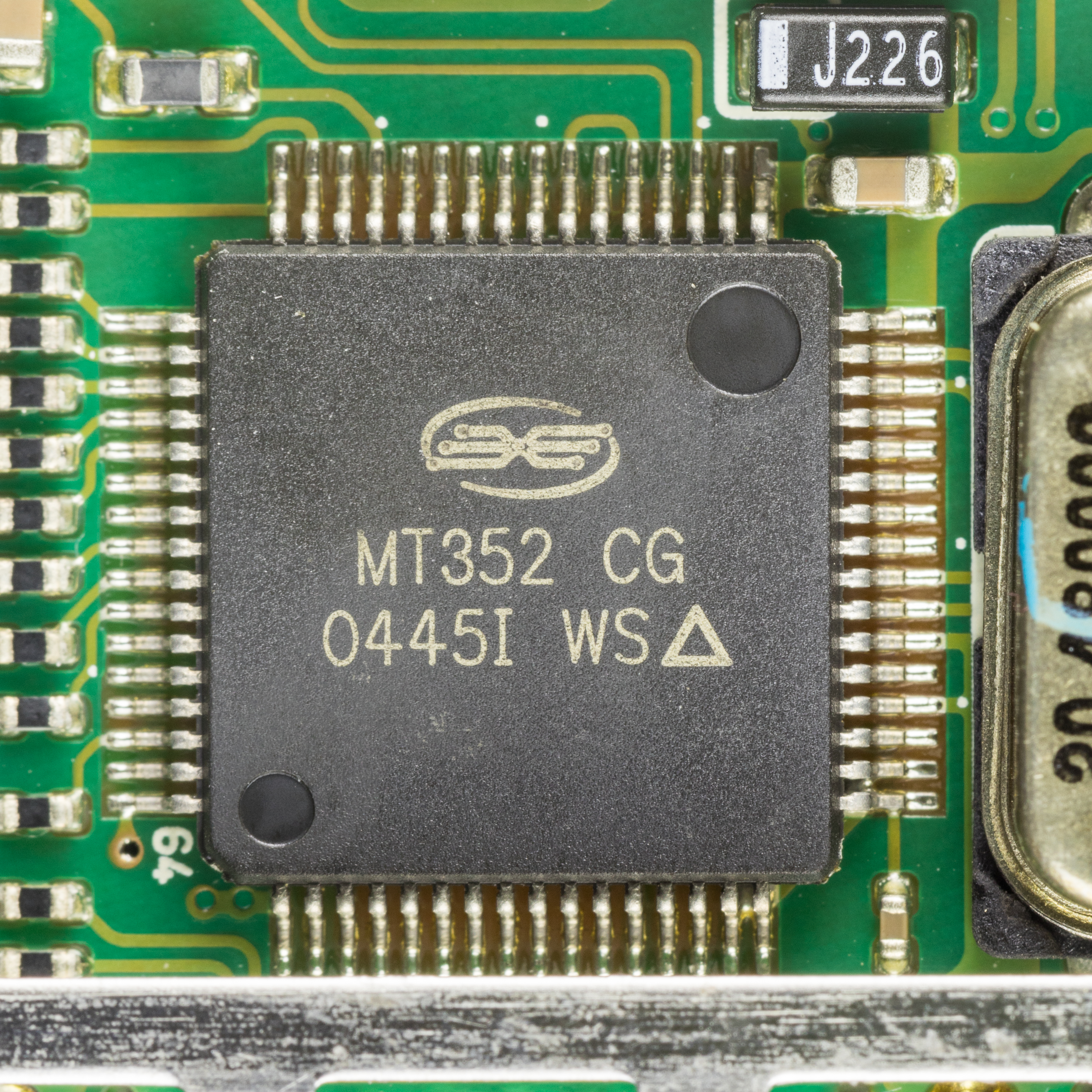
Zarlink MT352CG - a COFDM Demodulator

By 2000, the semiconductor and PBX divisions had combined annual revenues of USD $1.4 billion. However the semiconductor business was experiencing significant growth while the PBX division grew more slowly in the face of competition from Cisco, Avaya and other significant players.

=== PBX division ===
With Kirk Mandy as CEO and President, Mitel in 2001 sold its PBX division back to Terry Matthews along with the Mitel name for CDN $300 million. The PBX division had growth of 5-6% annually while the semiconductor division had been growing at 45-47%. Soon after, Mandy retired and was replaced by a management team drawn mainly from National Semiconductor.

=== Division renamed ===
The semiconductor division was renamed Zarlink to reflect its interest in networking. It derives either from the Latin word "Caesar" or Russian word "Tsar" meaning "one having great power or authority" and the word "link" which means "to connect or be connected". With the sale Zarlink became a pure play semiconductor company focused on specialized markets. Over time it became virtually fabless by selling essentially all of its fabrication plants and other manufacturing facilities to third parties and outsourcing the bulk of its production.

=== Foundry ===
In 2002 Zarlink sold its foundry in Bromont, Quebec, Canada to Dalsa Corporation, and its wafer fabrication facility in Plymouth, UK to X-FAB Semiconductor Foundries AG. In the same year, the company unveiled the industry's first high-density CESoP (Circuit Emulation Services-over-Packet) packet processor to allow service providers to carry TDM traffic over IP networks.

In 2003 it significantly expanded its timing portfolio to offer a comprehensive range of digital, analog and module synchronization products. With worsening economic conditions globally Zarlink implemented several workforce reductions while trying to widely diversify the company's product portfolio. This strategy proved to be unsuccessful. Mandy returned to head up the company in 2003. In the following years there were several additional workforce reductions and non-core assets were sold off.

=== RF Front-End ===
In 2005 it announced the sale of its RF Front-End consumer business to Intel and in 2006 the sale of its Packet Switching product group to Conexant Systems.

In 2004 one of Zarlink's RF transmitters was used in a swallowable camera capsule by Given Image. The chip was produced by X-Fab and transmits two movie-quality images per second from the capsule, allowing a more thorough and non-invasive examination of the gastrointestinal tract. In 2009 the company announced that it had shipped over one million RF chips for use in Given Imaging's PillCam SB video capsules.

=== Transceiver chip ===
In 2005 Zarlink introduced the ZL70100 ultra low-power transceiver chip that met the Medical Device Radiocommunications Service standard of the FCC and the ETSI, used to link implanted medical devices and base stations. In 2008 the ZL70101 won an EE Times Product of the Year award. In the same year the company announced that it had already shipped over 30,000 modules incorporating the chip to St. Jude Medical for use in implanted defibrillators. The chip and module is being designed into a variety of medical implantable devices and external instruments such as pacemakers, defibrillators, and devices used to treat dystonia, acute pain, parkinsons, epilepsy, and other advanced monitoring, diagnostic and therapeutic applications.

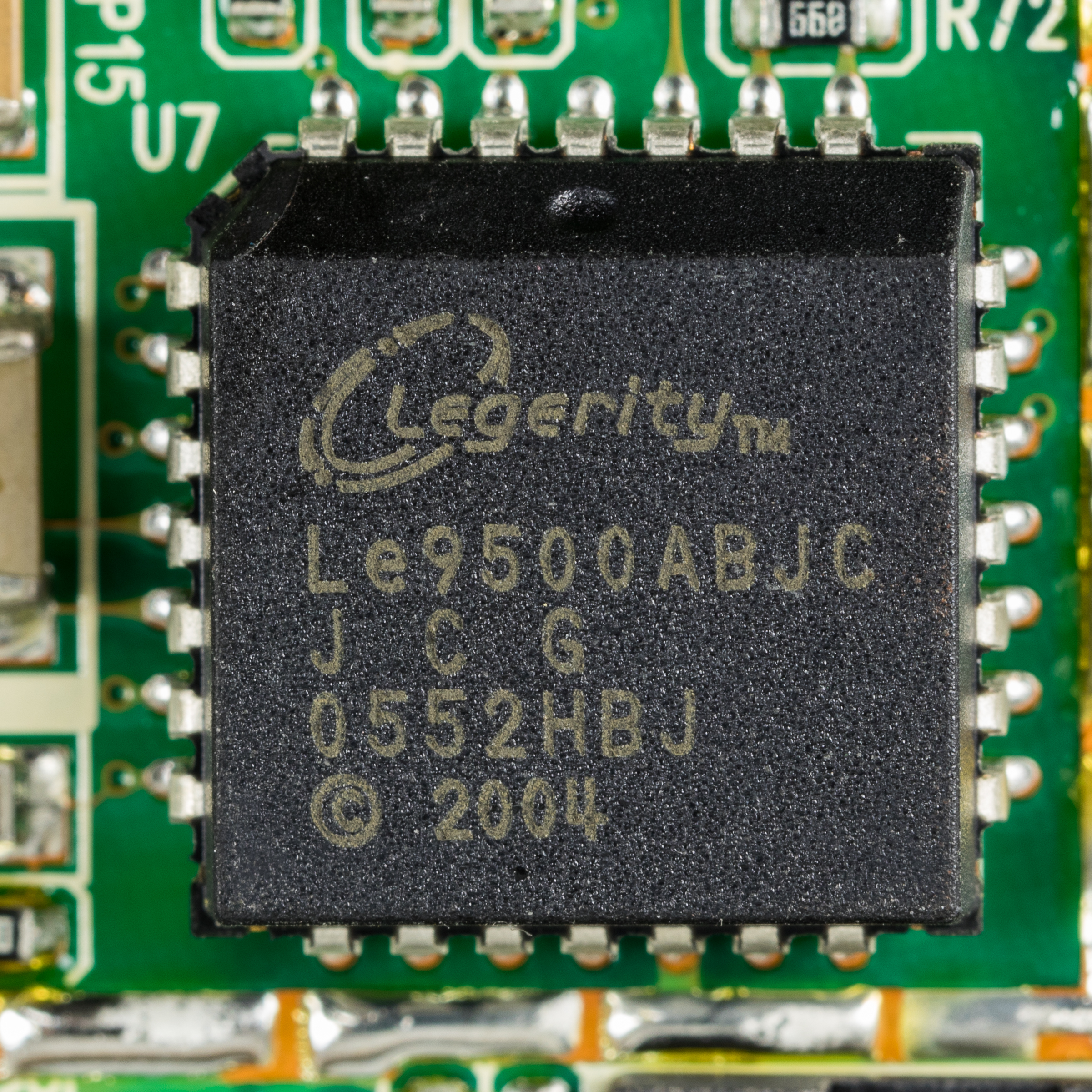
High-Voltage Ringing SLIC Device for VolP Applications from Legerity

In June 2007 Zarlink acquired Legerity, a privately held former division of AMD, headquartered in Austin, Texas for US$134.5 million in cash. Legerity was a supplier of analog voice technologies for carrier, enterprise and residential gateway equipment.

=== Analog foundry ===
In February 2008, it sold an unprofitable analog foundry in Swindon, United Kingdom and successfully defended itself against a dissident shareholder battle led by a 5 percent stakeholder accusing Zarlink of overspending on R&D.

=== Implant project ===
Zarlink announced a Zarlink-led Self-Energizing Implantable Medical Microsystem (SIMM) project which successfully designed and tested an in-body microgenerator that will harvest energy from the heartbeat to power implanted medical devices. In 2009 the project was named winner of the Emerging Technology Award at the Institution of Engineering and Technology's (IET) Innovation Awards in London, England.

=== Late history ===
In May 2010 it sold its Optical Products Group in Sweden and Phoenix and set its focus on its timing, synchronization, medical and line circuit businesses. In September 2010 it sold a campus located in Järfälla, Sweden for US$16M to a company affiliated with the Stendorren group in Stockholm. Following the Legerity acquisition Zarlink significantly reduced its manufacturing costs, made changes to its management team (including the appointment of Garry Tanner to CEO, formerly COO at Legerity), launched three new technology platforms (one for each of its businesses) and aggressively drove the company's finances forward. Fiscal 2011 operating income reached $39 million up from $19 million the previous year and net income reached $69 million, up from $7 million in 2011. In 2011 revenues from its timing and synchronization business grew by 38% while its voice telephony business grew by 34%. The company's share price rose tenfold compared to March 2009, and it roughly doubled its cash and cash equivalents to $124 million at the end of the first quarter, from $62 million a year earlier. Its revenues reached $220 million in fiscal 2011 and profits grew eightfold.

=== Takeover ===
Zarlink's turnaround attracted several supposedly "unsolicited" offers by Microsemi, an $800 million company. After being rebuffed Microsemi was forced to improve its valuation of the company. In reaction to the increased offers Zarlink's Board launched a strategic alternatives review process. In October, 2011 Microsemi agreed to acquire Zarlink for $3.98 a share, a nearly 70% premium over its trading price, for a total consideration of over USD $630 million.
