= Mary T. McDowell =

American executive and former CEO of Mitel

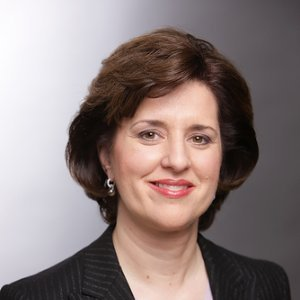
- Born: 1964 (age 61–62); Chicago, Illinois, US
- Education: U. Illinois - Engineering BS, 1986 Computer Science
- Occupation: Business executive

Mary T. McDowell (born 1964) is an American technology executive. From 2019-2021, she was CEO of Mitel, a global business communications provider. Prior to that, McDowell was CEO for Polycom from 2016 until its sale to Plantronics in 2018. While at Polycom, she led a strategic pivot to open ecosystems and bought Obihai to strengthen the company’s phone and cloud products. She is on the boards of Autodesk and Informa plc.

At Nokia she was in charge of its mobile phone division and oversaw the introduction of Nokia Asha feature phones, Nokia Life Tools, and Nokia Money.

Before Nokia, she worked at Compaq/Hewlett Packard from 1986 to 2003, where she was at one point in charge of its server division. In 2012 she was described as one of ten "disruptive individuals" reshaping the mobile phone industry.

In 2018, she was recognized as one of the top 10 women in telecommunications. She is a graduate of the University of Illinois College of Engineering.

== Personal life ==
McDowell is married to Kevin Longgino, the CEO of the National Kidney Foundation.

== Awards ==
- Distinguished Alumni Award 2011
- World Master of Innovation 2009
- Top 10 Women in Wireless 2008
- Top 20 Women in Technology 2000
