= Gandalf Technologies =

Former Canadian data communications company

Gandalf Technologies, Inc.
- Founded: 1971; 55 years ago
- Founders: Desmond Cunningham; Colin Patterson
- Defunct: August 7, 1997; 28 years ago
- Fate: Bankruptcy; acquired by Mitel
- Headquarters: Ottawa
- Website: gandalf.ca at the Wayback Machine (archived 1998-01-21)

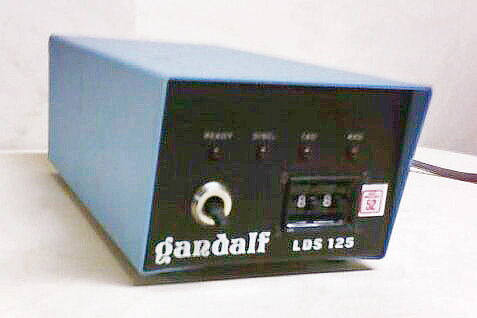
A Gandalf terminal host selector, or "Gandalf box", was a common feature in many university and company computer centers into the 1990s. It communicated with a Gandalf PACX crossbar in the machine room.

Gandalf Technologies, Inc. was a Canadian data communications company based in Ottawa. It was best known for modems and terminal adapters that allowed computer terminals to connect to host computers through a single interface. Gandalf also pioneered a radio-based mobile data terminal that was popular for many years in taxi dispatch systems. The rapid rise of TCP/IP relegated many of Gandalf's products to niche status, and the company went bankrupt in 1997; its assets were acquired by Mitel.

== History ==
Gandalf was founded by Desmond Cunningham and Colin Patterson in 1971, and started business from the lobby of the Skyline Hotel, which is now the Crowne Plaza Hotel, on Albert Street in Ottawa.

The company's first products were industrial-looking half-bridges for remote terminals which were supported by large terminal multiplexers on the "computer end". Gandalf referred to these systems as a "PACX", in analogy to the telephony PABX which provided similar services in the voice field. These systems allowed the user to "dial up" the Gandalf box and then instruct it what computer they wanted to connect to. In this fashion, large computer networks could be built in a single location using shared resources, as opposed to having to dedicate terminals to different machines. These systems were particularly popular in large companies and universities.

Gandalf supplanted these systems with "true" modems, both for host-to-host use and for remote workers. Unlike most modems, Gandalf's devices were custom systems intended to connect only to another Gandalf modem, and were designed to extract the maximum performance possible. Gandalf sold a number of different designs intended to be used with different line lengths and qualities, from 4-wire modems running at 9600 bit/s over "short" distances (bumped to 19,200 bit/s in later models), to 2400 bit/s models for 2-wire runs over longer distances. On the host-end, modem blocks could be attached to the same PACX multiplexers, making local and remote access largely identical.

With the introduction of low-cost high-speed modems in the early 1990s, Gandalf increasingly became irrelevant. Even highest-speed solutions were soon being outperformed by standardized systems like v.32bis. Low-cost terminal adapters based on RADIUS (and similar) technologies connecting to Ethernet further eroded its core businesses, offering features similar to PACX switches. Gandalf's solutions were decidedly "low tech"; users selected what computer they wanted to connect to by selecting a two-digit number on the front of the modem, often requiring a "phone book" if more than one host computer was being used. In comparison, the more modern terminal adapters generally included a command line interface that allowed the user to select a host from a directory that appeared on their terminal. Introductions of Ethernet concentrators and ISDN-based versions of earlier host adapters did little to fix the problem, never becoming very popular in comparison to the standardized solutions from other vendors.

Gandalf Technologies filed for bankruptcy in 1997. Mitel purchased all of the product business of Gandalf, including intellectual properties, the goodwill of the business including the exclusive right to use the name worldwide for $14.9 million. Mitel used the data technology and personnel to help move its PBX division into the VoIP market. Mitel tried to keep some Gandalf data products in the market for a short time, but poor sales led to them being abandoned.
