= Chowaniec =

Chowaniec is a Polish surname. Notable people with the surname include:

- Adam Chowaniec (1950–2015), Canadian engineer, entrepreneur, and educator
- Andrzej Chowaniec (born 1958), Polish ice hockey player
- Stefan Chowaniec (born 1953), Polish ice hockey player

== See also ==
- Chovanec, Czech and Slovak surname
