= Adam Chowaniec =

Canadian businessman

Adam Chowaniec (1950–2015) was a Canadian engineer, entrepreneur, and educator. He is recognised as one of the Founding Fathers of the Personal Computer, by the Computer History Museum at Mountain View, California. In later life, Adam Chowaniec became a champion of Canadian business and entrepreneurship. He died, from cancer, in 2015.

== Early life ==
Chowaniec was born in Leeds, England, in 1950, the son of a Polish engineer (and former prisoner-of-war in Siberia) who had emigrated to England after World War Two. He studied Electronic and Electrical Engineering at the University of Sheffield, completing his undergraduate degree in 1971, and securing a Commonwealth Scholarship to Queen's University, to gain his master's degree. He obtained a PhD from Sheffield in 1975. After completing his studies, Chowaniec moved back to Canada to take up a post as Professor of Electrical Engineering at Acadia University, Nova Scotia.

== Career overview ==
In 1976 Chowaniec left academia for a career in engineering management, joining Bell-Northern Research, later to become Northern Telecom Limited (Nortel), a multinational telecommunications manufacturing corporation based in Mississauga, Ontario.

In 1983, Chowaniec joined Commodore International at West Chester, Pennsylvania to become Vice-President of World Product Development. The company had sold many millions of its popular Commodore 64 personal computer, but needed a new product to maintain its competitive position. Chowaniec later recalled that he was given 18 months to develop this new computer, complete with operating system, from scratch. The new machine was the Amiga. It sold between 4 – 6 million units, and provided a platform for games including Lemmings and Worms. Commentator Jeremy Reimer described it as "seem[ing] like it came from ten years in the future", while Byte thought it "so far ahead of its time that almost nobody – including Commodore's marketing department – could fully articulate what it was all about."

The Amiga was launched at the Lincoln Center in New York in July 1985, the first affordable PC offering full colour graphics with a palette of 4,096 colours. The artist Andy Warhol demonstrated its capabilities at the launch event by using it to "paint" a picture of Debbie Harry; the Blondie singer also attended, and performed, at the launch. 1986 saw Chowaniec return to Ottawa as President of CALMOS, which was seeking leadership with experience in the US technology marketplace. Under his management, the company doubled in size through a well-judged acquisition, and grew further after it won a large federal grant to work with a British partner on integrated circuit development. CALMOS was sold to Welsh businessman and entrepreneur Terry Matthews's Newbridge Networks in 1989.

In 1995, Newbridge Networks determined to divest itself of its microsystems division whilst retaining a financial interest in its future, and the division was sold into a new corporation to be known as Tundra Semiconductor, financed through private investment and venture capital. Chowaniec was one of the co-founders of this new enterprise, which he regarded as his proudest achievement; he went on to become its Chairman. The company went public early in 1999. Its shares, which opened at $9.25, were trading at $78 by March 2000, and the company was added to the major Toronto stock market indices. Chowaniec served on a number of industry-related bodies, including the National Sciences and Engineering Council, the Information Technology Association, and the Public Sector Advisory Board. He was Chairman of the Ontario Research and Innovation Council for three years from 2006 to 2009, and served on the board of the Export Development Corporation, appointed by the Privy Council of Canada. In an interview with the Financial Post, Terry Matthews described Chowaniec as "a kind of foundation stone for Canadian technology".

== Community involvement ==
In addition to his many business interests, Adam Chowaniec took an active role in more community-focussed initiatives, including the Ottawa Partnership and the Ottawa Health Research Institute. Chowaniec also chaired the national fundraising campaign for the Canadian Museum of Nature in Ottawa.

== Recognition, honours and awards ==
Adam Chowaniec received several awards in recognition of his work. These included the Ottawa-Carleton Research Institute's Chairman's Award in 1998, and the Business Person of the Year Award from the Ottawa Chamber of Commerce in 1999; he received the Queen's Jubilee Medal in 2002 in recognition of his contribution to public life. He is celebrated at the Computer History Museum in Mountain View, California, as one of the Founding Fathers of the Personal Computer, in recognition of his work leading the team that developed the Amiga.
