= Wesley Clover Parks =

Recreational park in Ottawa, Ontario, Canada

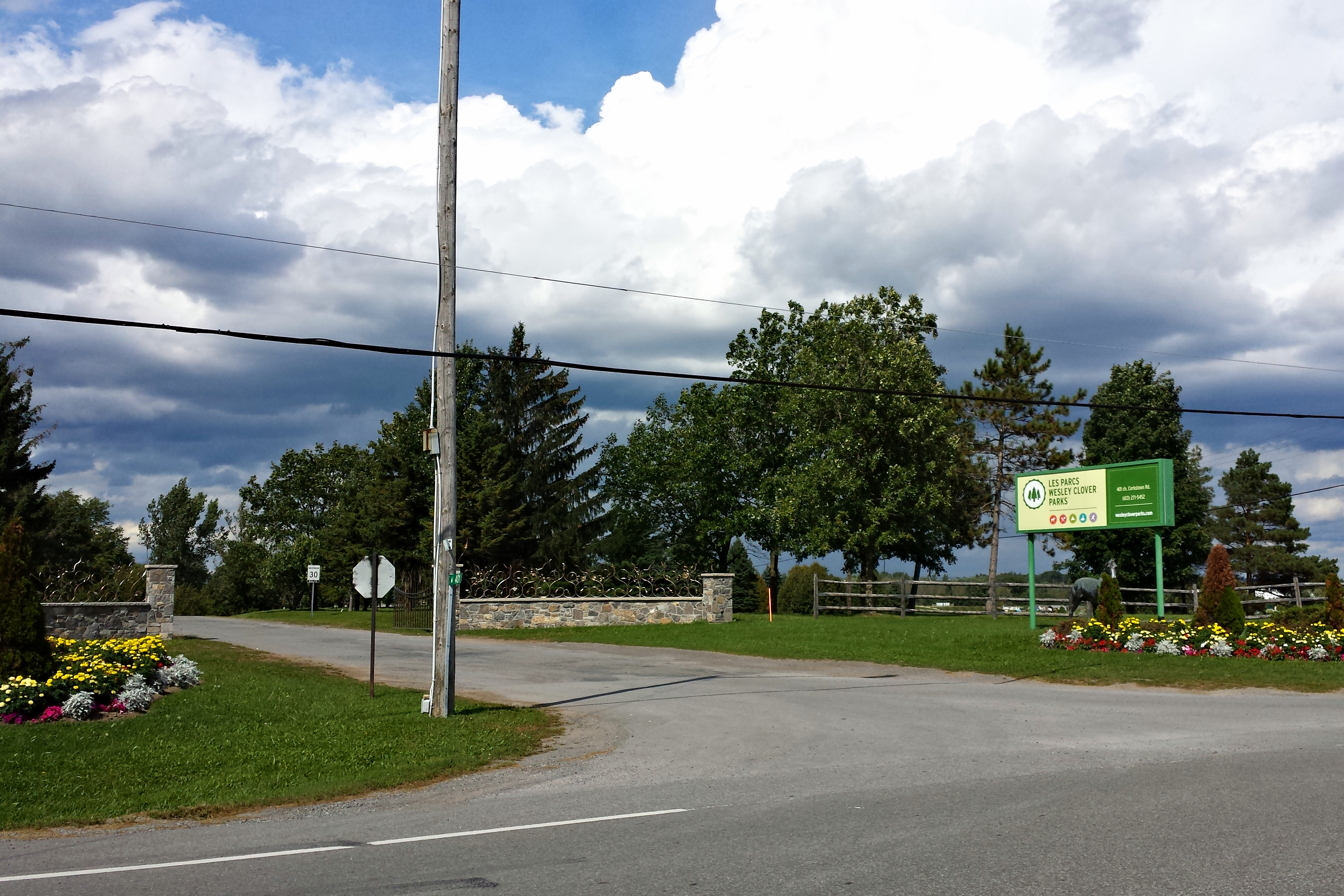
- Entrance to equestrian park
- Interactive map of Wesley Clover Parks
- Location: 401 Corkstown Road; Ottawa, Ontario; K2H 8T1
- Coordinates: 45°20′22″N 75°51′10″W
- Area: 500 acres (200 ha)
- Opened: 2014
- Owner: National Capital Commission
- Operator: Wesley Clover Foundation
- Website: www.wesleycloverparks.com

The Wesley Clover Parks are recreational parklands in Ottawa, Ontario, Canada, located at the intersection of the 416 and 417 highways in the former city of Nepean. Wesley Clover Parks was established in 2014 when the Wesley Clover Foundation took over operations of the former Nepean National Equestrian Park, and the adjacent Ottawa Municipal Campground.

== Facilities ==
Wesley Clover Parks' 500 acres (200 ha) property includes the stables and indoor arena, as well as several outdoor sand rings for riding, acres of pasture space, a cross-country course, a large wooded area that is home to many species of local wildlife, and a campground. The cross country course accommodates four levels of difficulty and is used for competitions.

== Activities ==
Wesley Clover Parks hosts and produces a number of annual equestrian events including:

- Ottawa Equestrian Tournaments
- Ottawa Horse Day
- Wesley Clover Parks Bronze/Silver Hunter/Jumper Horse Shows
- Ottawa Horse Trials

Wesley Clover Parks is also the equestrian centre of choice for third party horse show producers, who lease the facility for competitions and events throughout the season. Past events include Polo in the Park Ottawa, third party Bronze/Silver shows, the Ottawa Dressage Festival, and Eventing at the Parks.

Wesley Clover Parks has been the host venue for a number of charity runs including the Color Vibe 5K and the BADASS Dash. The site is used for charity runs, endurance races, festivals, sporting events, and equestrian competitions.

Wesley Clover Parks harvests over 100-acres of hay to feed over 55 horses and 1 donkey who call the Parks home, part of a long-term commitment to sustainable farming. With the help of GeesBees Honey Company, Wesley Clover Parks brought in over 300,000 honey bees, and now host 6 hives on site to help support the bee population.

== History ==
The Nepean National Equestrian Park first began construction in 1974. Ted De Long first proposed the project with the intention of creating an affordable riding program for those who could not buy or lease horses themselves. The facility would serve the west end and capital region. The property was leased from the National Capital Commission, and first operated by a partnership between the March and Nepean Townships. The riding school was also intended to provide access to athletics programs for girls, while the city's commitments to hockey rinks and sports fields were seen as mostly serving boys. At its conception, De Long intended the park to offer both English and Western riding lessons, as well as other disciplines such as driving and horse-drawn skiing. Riders training for competitions would also be able to rent the facilities.

The stables were designed by a local architect, Walter Coates, and built in 1976. The construction of the indoor arena was delayed due to lack of funds. The arena wasn't constructed until 1981.

In 2012, the City of Ottawa ended its lease of the property. The riding school was closed, and the horses were sold. The lease was eventually awarded to the Wesley Clover Foundation, a private not-for-profit philanthropic corporation associated with high-tech entrepreneur Terry Matthews. The Foundation intends to invest more than $20 million to give the site a full re-construction. Plans for the Parks include a new riding school, created in partnership with Canadian Olympian rider Ian Millar, an upgrade to the show grounds, new public seating, and new horseback riding trails. The Parks will also host non-equestrian facilities, such as several full-sized summer sports fields, a new home for the royal swans, an outdoor skating rink, skiing and hiking trails, a campground, and a nature school for young children. The Parks intend to draw more international equestrian events, as well as more participation from the non-equestrian community in outdoor sports.

Anne, Princess Royal toured the facilities on Remembrance Day 2014 and dedicated in her name, The Princess Royal Riding Ring.

A state-of-the-art artificial turf soccer field was constructed at the east end of the Parks, close to the Queensway and Moodie Drive, for use as a practice facility during the 2015 FIFA Women's World Cup.

== Notable events ==
- The inaugural Ottawa International Horse Show was June 17–21, 2015. The largest class was the Brookstreet Grand Prix on June 20, 2015, where Ian Millar, Beth Underhill, Ainsley Vince, and Amy Millar competed. Elizabeth Bates won the Grand Prix. Beth Underhill won the $100,000 CSI2 Classic on July 24, 2016.
- The inaugural Ottawa National Horse Show was July 13–17, 2016. Ian Millar won the $50,000 Brookstreet Grand Prix on July 16, 2016.
- A George Morris Riding Clinic took place October 9, 2015 to October 11, 2015.
- Shania Twain performed on June 27, 2015, as part of her Rock This Country Tour featuring The Doobie Brothers, Dan + Shay, and Wesley MacInnes. It was her only outdoor performance in North America on the tour and first show in Ottawa in a decade. 24,000 people attended the concert.
- The Ottawa Fall Horse Trials took place on September 25, 2016.
