= Chovanec =

Chovanec (Czech pronunciation: [ˈxovanɛts]; feminine: Chovancová, in Slovak also Chovanecová) is a Czech and Slovak surname. The word chovanec is an archaic term for 'adoptee'. Notable people with the surname include:

- Ján Chovanec (born 1984), Slovak footballer
- Jozef Chovanec (born 1960), Czech-Slovak footballer and manager
- Marián Chovanec (born 1957), Slovak bishop
- Milan Chovanec (born 1970), Czech politician
- Patrick Chovanec (born 1970), American economist
- Zdeněk Chovanec (2004–2026), Czech-Venezuelan racing driver

== See also ==
- Chowaniec, Polish surname
- Schovanec
