= Michael Cowpland =

British businessman

- Born: April 23, 1943 (age 83); Bexhill-on-Sea, Sussex, England
- Occupations: Entrepreneur and business executive
- Known for: Founder of Corel

Michael Cowpland (born April 23, 1943, in Bexhill-on-Sea) is a British-born Canadian businessman. He is the founder and one-time president, chairman and CEO of Corel, a Canadian software company.

== Career ==
=== Mitel ===
Cowpland worked for Bell Northern Research (later part of Nortel Networks), then MicroSystems International. In 1973, Cowpland and Terry Matthews founded Mitel Corporation, a company that developed and sold electronic PBX systems. Initial success made both founders millionaires. Sales peaked at $250 million, but over-expansion and development problems saw the company bought by British Telecom.

=== Corel ===
Matthews went on to found Newbridge Networks, while Cowpland launched Cowpland Research Laboratory (soon Corel) in Ottawa in 1985. At first, the company sold DTP workstations, but success did not arrive until the launch of the graphics software CorelDRAW in 1989.

In 1996, he offered a challenge to Microsoft with a move into productivity software, acquiring WordPerfect from Novell for $158 million. However this was unsuccessful as Microsoft managed to get many new computers loaded with Microsoft Word along with Windows. The company also made unsuccessful forays into CAD, videoconferencing, Java, Linux and other developments.

He was investigated by the Ontario Securities Commission (OSC) in 1999–2000 regarding allegations that he had used insider information to sell $20 million in Corel shares at $8/share shortly before the company posted disappointing results. The two sides settled the case in 2003, with Cowpland agreeing to pay $575,000. Subsequent to Cowpland's alleged insider sale at $8, Corel shares hit a peak of $60/share around November 1999, during the height of the Linux boom when Corel's Desktop Linux was seen to be a potential rival to Microsoft Windows.

Michael resigned as Corel's CEO in August 2000.

After an unsuccessful attempt to buy Borland with a view to creating a critical mass for Linux, Cowpland left Corel in August 2000, and moved on to buy control of ZIM corporation, a database and mobile content company which is listed on the NASDAQ bulletin board (ZIMCF).

== Personal life ==
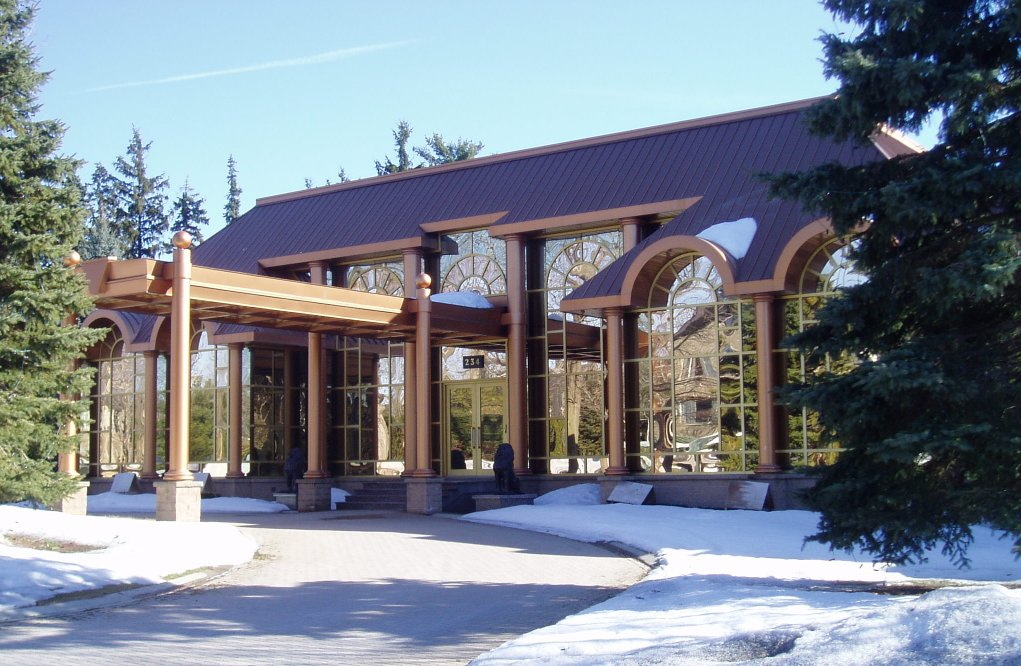
Cowpland's unique home in Rockcliffe Park, Ottawa, Ontario

He was married to his first wife Darlene until 1991 when they divorced. They have two daughters, Paula and Christine. In 1992, he married his second wife, Marlen Cowpland. The couple live in a $14-million 1,800-square-metre mansion in Rockcliffe Park, Ontario.
