= Schovanec =

Schovanec (feminine: Schovancová) is a Czech surname. The word schovanec is an archaic term for 'foster child'. Notable people with the surname include:

- Josef Schovanec (born 1981), French philosopher and writer
- Lawrence Schovanec (born 1952), American mathematician and academic administrator

== See also ==
- Chovanec, Czech surname
