= Mitel Superset =

Family of Canadian telephones

The Mitel Superset is a line of telephones made by Mitel. The line began in 1983, with the Superset 4, Mitel's best-selling device to date.

== Mitel Superset Models ==
=== The Mitel Superset 4DN Telephone ===
The Superset 4DN was one of the first Digital Telephones made by Mitel and was announced in October 1986.

=== Mitel Superset 400 Series ===
The 400 range consisted of a 401+,410,420 and 430 The telephones connected back to the Mitel exchange digitally using 1 pair of cables. A Mitel MT8971BP IC was used in this range of handsets to communicate with a port on the DNIC card in a SX 50, SX 200 or SX 2000 Mitel switch

All in this range apart from the 401+ were loud speaking telephones, allowing the user to converse fully hands free.

=== Mitel Superset 4000 Series ===
The 4000 series supersedes the 400 series and consists of the 4001,4015,4125 and 4150.

The Superset 4001 has no LCD and has similar functionality to the 401+ The 4001 has 4 main IC's - A Motorola SC427602FN With 93C46B, MT9196AP, MT9171AP and a MC33362 PSU IC

== Gallery ==
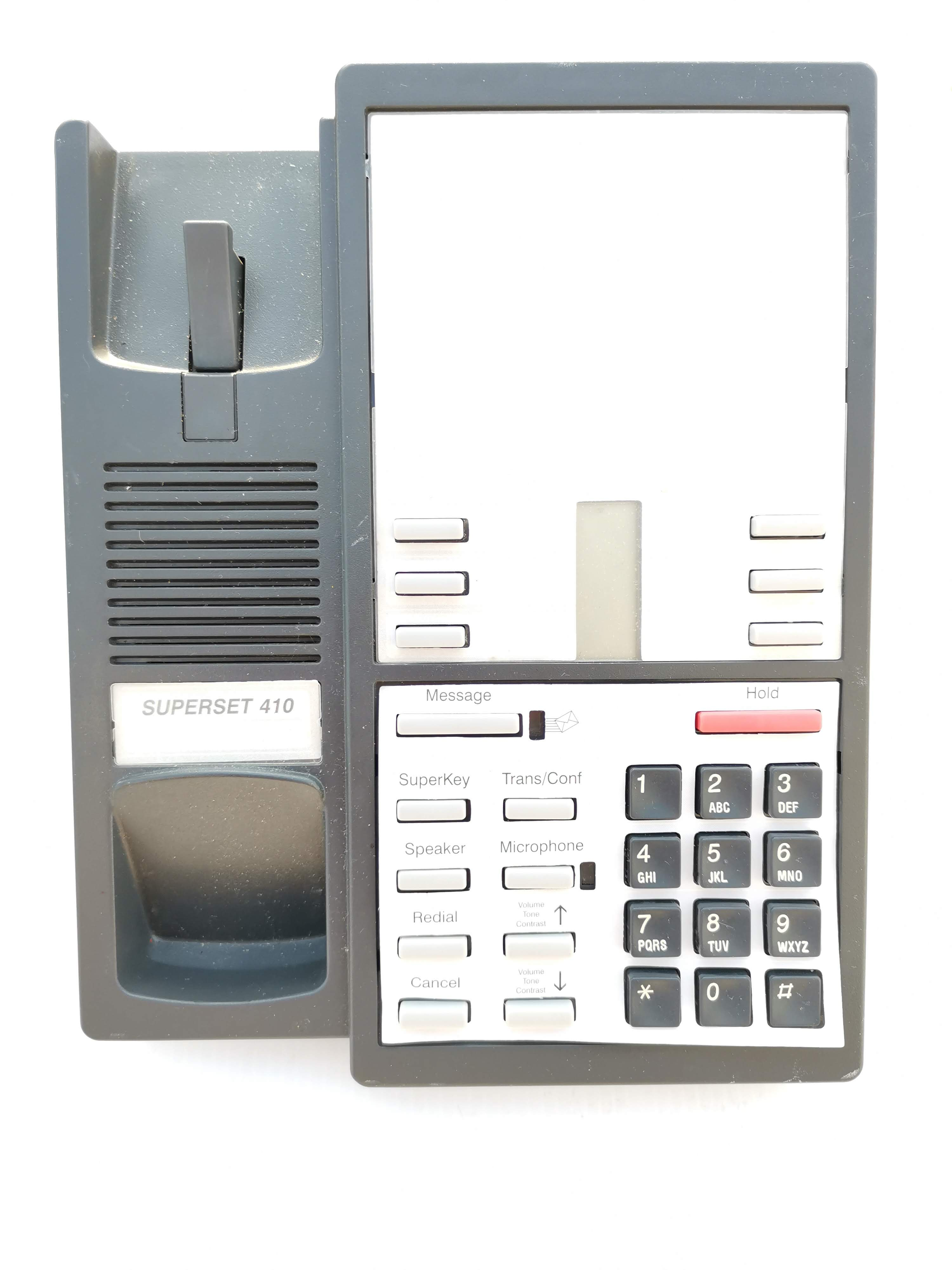
Mitel SUPERSET 410

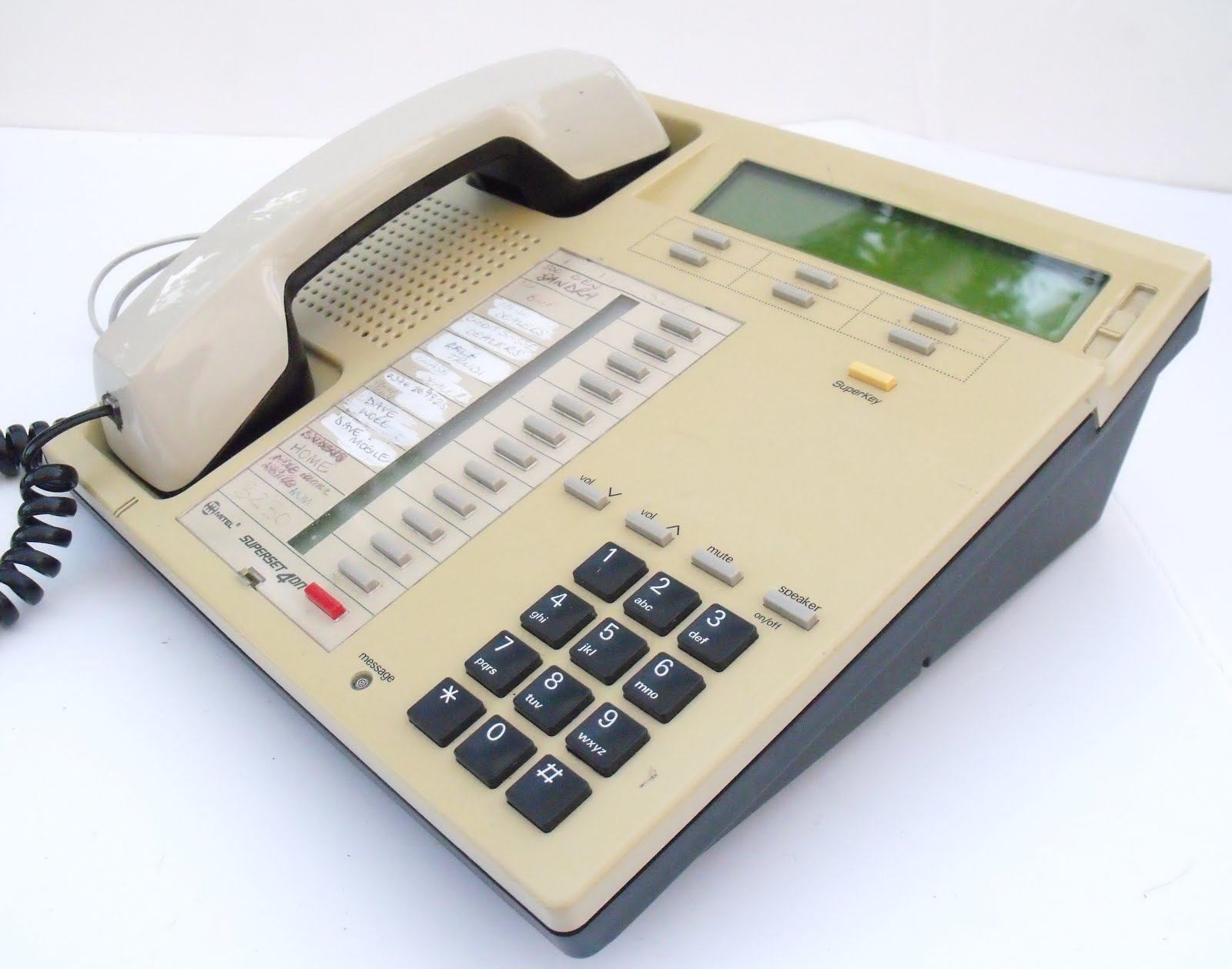
Mitel SUPERSET 4DN

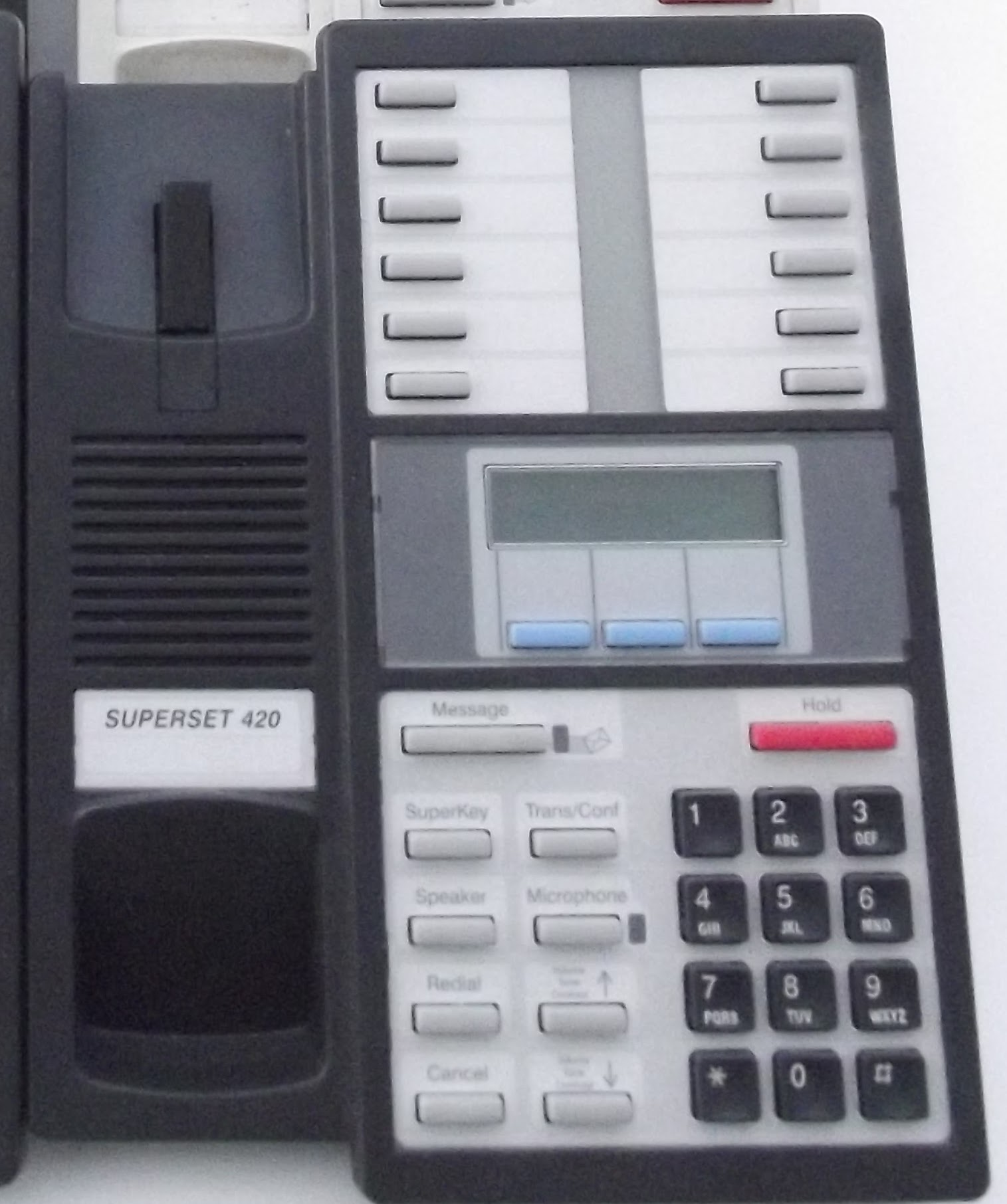
Mitel SUPERSET 420

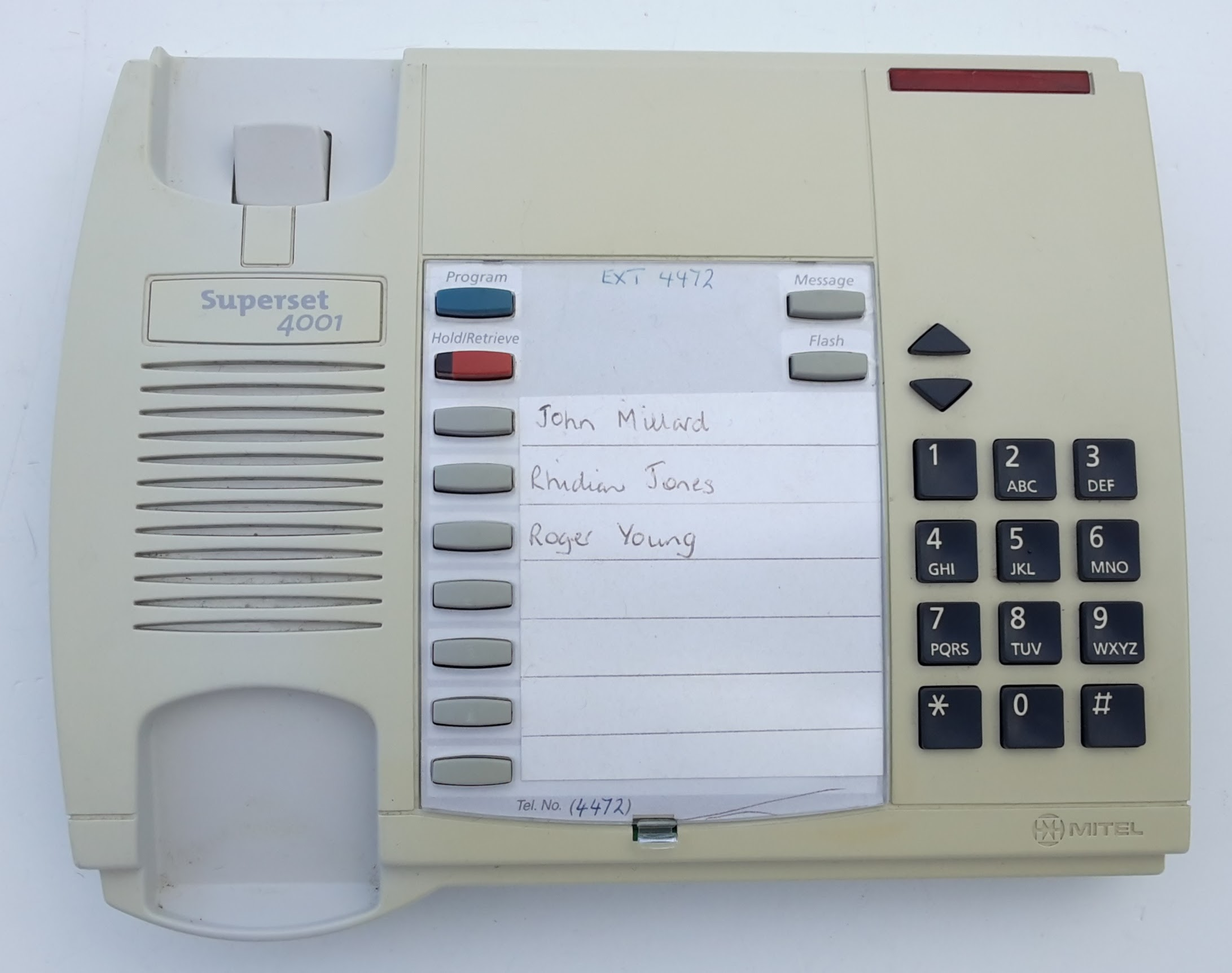
Mitel Superset 4001

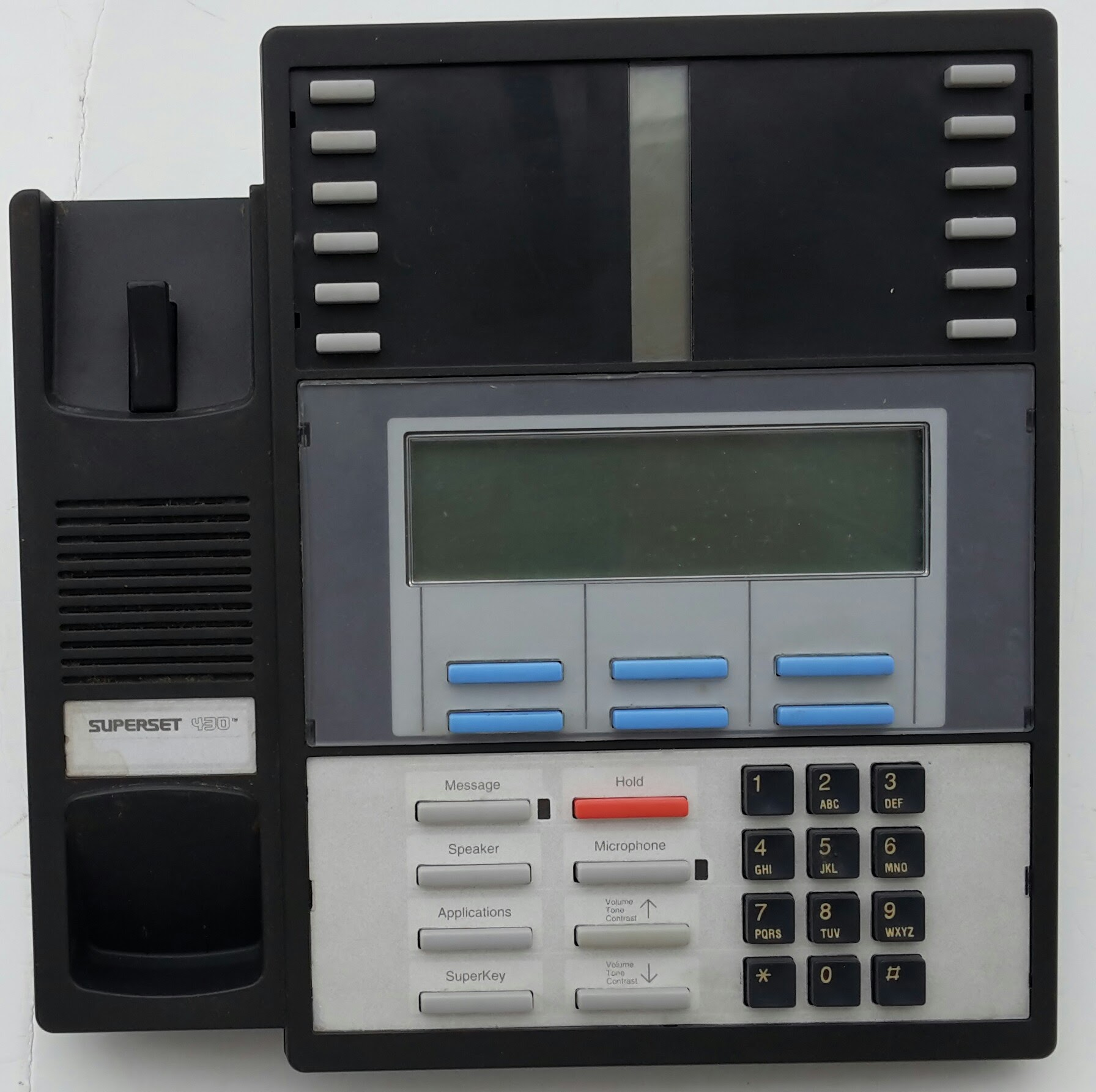
Mitel Superset 430 Telephone with Graphical LCD and line buttons

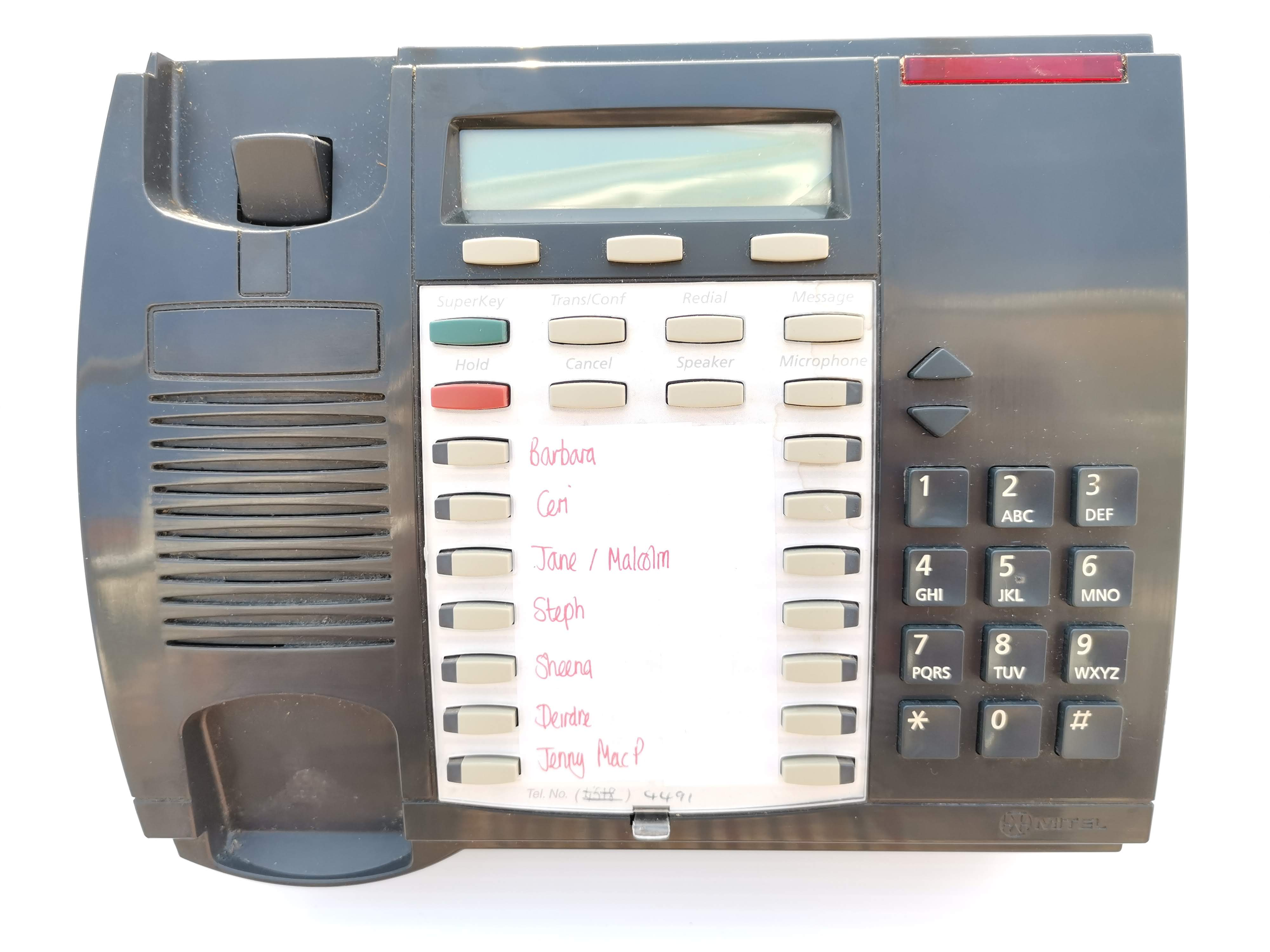
Mitel Superset 4025
