= MKC Networks =

- Type: Private
- Industry: Telecommunications
- Headquarters: Ottawa, Ontario, Canada
- Products: SIP equipment

MKC Networks was a privately owned supplier of VoIP (Voice over IP) equipment and software components headquartered in Ottawa, Ontario, Canada. It designed and sold a family of SIP-based products including advanced SIP Enterprise Application Servers and scalable communication platforms.

MKC Networks bought certain SIP intellectual property in 2003 from a company called Mitel Knowledge. Mitel Knowledge was created to hold the intellectual property of Mitel Networks. Through some internal exploratory R&D work, it evolved into a supplier of SIP-based equipment.

The intellectual property of Mitel Networks was returned to that company's ownership in 2003.

MKC Networks was acquired by NewHeights Software on September 1, 2006. In 2007, NewHeights was acquired by CounterPath Corporation.
