= BreconRidge =

- Founded: 2001
- Founder: Terry Matthews
- Owner: Sanmina-SCI

The name BreconRidge was based on the practice of founder Terry Matthews to name companies after geographic entities, especially those connected to his childhood home in the Marches area on the border of Wales and England. BreconRidge was derived from the Brecon Beacons range of mountains in Wales, and from the seed company Ridgeway Research Corporation.

== Ownership Status ==
Acquired/Merged

On May 28, 2010, BreconRidge Corporation, based in Ottawa, Ontario, was acquired by California's Sanmina-SCI (NASDAQ: SANM), a top provider of electronics manufacturing services. The acquisition, worth $53 million, aims to enhance Sanmina-SCI's RF/microwave and micro/opto-electronic capabilities by integrating BreconRidge's advanced design and engineering team along with their cutting-edge manufacturing operations. Fasken Martineau advised BreconRidge and its board during the sale, with a team led by Brian McIntomny and including Bob Chapman, Charles Lynch (securities, corporate/M&A), Anthony Baldanza, Mark Magro (competition), and student-at-law Jason Tsoukas.
