= Terry Matthews =

Welsh-Canadian business magnate, serial high-tech entrepreneur (born 1943)

Sir Terry Matthews OC OBE FREng FIET
- Born: 6 June 1943 (age 83); Newport, Wales
- Education: Swansea University
- Occupation: Chairman of Wesley Clover
- Spouse: Ann Matthews
- Children: 4, including Trevor Matthews

Sir Terence Hedley Matthews OC OBE FREng FIET (born 6 June 1943) is a Welsh-Canadian business magnate, serial high-tech entrepreneur, and Wales's first billionaire. He was the richest man in Wales until 2012, when he was surpassed by Michael Moritz.

He has founded or funded over 100 companies in the high-tech communications field, most notably Mitel and Newbridge Networks. He is the chairman of Wesley Clover and the Swansea Bay City Region board. He owns the Celtic Manor Resort, KRP Properties, the Brookstreet Hotel, and the Marshes Golf Club.

== Early life ==
Matthews was born in Newport, South Wales, at the then Lydia Beynon Maternity Hospital. Matthews returned as an adult to include the manor house that housed the hospital within the Celtic Manor Resort. He grew up in the town of Newbridge, Caerphilly. He studied at Swansea University and received a bachelor's degree in Electronics in 1969.

== Career ==
After an apprenticeship at British Telecom's research lab at Martlesham Heath, Matthews left Britain and joined MicroSystems International, a chipmaking operation affiliated with Northern Telecom (which became Nortel Networks) in Ottawa, Ontario, Canada.

=== Mitel ===
Matthews' first enterprise was started in collaboration with fellow Briton and Microsystems employee Michael Cowpland in 1972. To raise seed money for future enterprises they had planned, the pair intended to import and sell electric lawnmowers built in the UK. According to Matthews, the name Mitel was a contraction of "Mike and Terry Lawnmowers". This first endeavour was a fiasco; the shipping company carrying the first batch lost the container. When the lawnmowers finally arrived, the ground was covered with snow in the Canadian winter and no one would buy them. Matthews later said "That taught me a key lesson – the importance of timing. The shipping company lost the lawnmowers! By the time they showed up no-one wanted them, as you can't cut grass when it's covered with snow."

Mitel became a technology consultancy company run from home to the various companies around Ottawa's emerging high-tech district. Mitel's clients included the National Research Council, the Communications Research Centre, and a handful of pioneering start-ups including SHL Systemhouse, which was later purchased by EDS and now is part of HP and Quasar Systems (now Cognos).

Obtaining funding from a $1,000,000 bank loan, as well as from their own savings and a group of angel investors (notably Kent Plumley), the two developed a telephony DTMF tone receiver based on Cowpland's PhD thesis. This was a major advance in the technology, since they were able to sell receivers at a fraction of the cost of competing versions, while gaining returns of 1000%. Additionally, Mitel later became a chip manufacturer with the acquisition of the Silek foundry in Bromont, Quebec.

Later, the pair realized that the then-new technology of microprocessors and other semiconductor devices would make a similar change in the market for small PBXs. The SX200 PBX launched to immense success, being cheaper to purchase, quicker to install and far more functional. Mitel became one of the more successful manufacturers of small PBX systems and telecom semiconductors in the world, floating on the New York Stock Exchange in 1981.

In 1985, British Telecom bought a controlling interest in Mitel. Cowpland would later form the company that became Corel, and Matthews later founded Newbridge Networks.

=== Newbridge Networks ===
In 1986, Matthews drove Newbridge to become a leader in the worldwide data networking industry, manufacturing data communications products, especially ATM devices and routers. In 2000 the company employed more than 6,500 employees with recorded FY 1999 revenue of $1.8 billion. Later in 2000, Newbridge was acquired by Alcatel for $7.1 billion. Matthews' personal stake in Newbridge was valued at over a billion dollars, and as a result of the transaction he became the largest single shareholder in Alcatel.

=== Return to Mitel ===
In 2000, he reacquired the Mitel PBX business and company name, taking it private. He has invested heavily ($600 million by 2006) in Mitel to turn it into a broadband communications company. The company has made significant investments in enterprise Voice over IP telephony technology. Mitel's manufacturing business was spun off as BreconRidge. The company acquired Intertel in April 2007. Mitel went public again in 2010. Mitel announced the purchase of Aastra Technologies in November 2013. Mitel announced the purchase of Mavenir Systems in March 2015. Mitel announced the purchase of Polycom in April 2016, however, the deal fell through and Polycom instead merged with private equity firm Siris Capital Group. In July 2017, Mitel announced they had reached a deal to buy ShoreTel for $430 million, increasing the size of the company to 4,200 employees. On 24 April 2018, the company announced it would be bought by an investor group led by Searchlight Capital Partners.

=== Other businesses ===
- Wesley Clover – Matthews is the founder and chairman of the investment group. Headquartered in Ottawa, Ontario, Canada, Wesley Clover has offices in the United States, United Kingdom, India, China and Russia. Investments in Information and communication technologies, digital media, and real estate.
- Celtic Manor Resort - A 5* resort with a golf club attached to it, in Newport, South Wales
- KRP Properties - Matthews company which manages land and buildings in the Kanata North Business Park
- March Networks - Provider of IP video solutions. IPO on 27 April 2005. This venture was the first successful high tech IPO in the Ottawa area since 1999.
- Bridgewater Systems – a software company enabling mobile service providers to personalize, manage, and deliver applications. Acquired by Amdocs in June 2011 for $215 Million
- Ubiquity Software – Developer of SIP/IMS Application Server software platform, which was acquired by Avaya in Feb 2007 for about U.S. $150M and is the basis of Avaya's next generation solutions.
- Convedia – a maker of VoIP/IMS Media Servers, which was acquired by RadiSys in 2006 for $US 105 Million and is the basis of Radisys' MediaEngine solutions.
- Celtic House – Matthews and Roger Maggs co-founded Celtic House International Corporation (CHIC) in 1994. The objective was to invest in emerging high technology companies, primarily in the UK and Canada. In 2002, CHIC was re-structured to form Celtic House Venture Partners, a limited partnership owned and managed independent of Matthews.
- Newport Networks - a maker of large carrier-grade session border controllers. On 18 March 2009, Newport Networks, with its two remaining employees, de-listed from the AIM. This is despite having announced twelve months earlier that the company had signed a major OEM agreement which was expected to substantially increase its product sales. The company has subsequently been wound up and liquidated.
- Alacrity Incubator and Accelerator Program - Matthews founded Alacrity in 2009 along with his son, Owen Matthews, and Simon Gibson. Alacrity is a non-profit organization aimed at connecting established Western Canadian companies with venture capitalists and investment firms.

Additionally, Matthews is on the board of directors for a number of high tech companies including Solace (formerly Solace Systems), and chairs CounterPath Corporation and Benbria Corporation.

== Wales ==
Matthews spends a considerable amount of time in his native Wales, working on such ventures as the Celtic Manor Resort, a leisure complex in Newport, near the south Wales coast, chosen to host the 2010 Ryder Cup golf tournament and the 2014 NATO summit. The Celtic Manor hosted the ISPS Handa Wales Open for 15 years. The original Celtic Manor Hotel was formerly a maternity hospital and is Matthews' birthplace.

Matthews bought Celtic Manor in 1980, ploughing £100m into the project. Firstly the 19th century Manor House was renovated, while in 1991 plans were unveiled to develop two new golf courses and a convention centre between the manor and the River Usk. Matthews had become friends with golf course architect, the late Robert Trent Jones Snr, whose family roots were in Aberystwyth. Work began on the 'Roman Road' course in 1992, named after the main route connecting the former Roman fortress of Caerleon with the town of Caerwent, which crosses the land. In 1994 the 4,000-yard 'Coldra Woods' golf course was started, as well as the £10m golf clubhouse hotel.

Celtic Manor was Hotel of the Year in 2002, and won two European Design Awards in 2001 - one for the interior designers, Goff Associates, and one for its spa from the International Spa Association. Matthews commented that: "I think the resort can act as a magnet to draw new investment into Wales from across the UK and overseas. I did my best to put up a building that you can see from the West End of London and I didn't come far short of it!".

In September 2014, Matthews was appointed chairman of the Swansea Bay City Region Board. The Swansea Bay City Region Board is backing a Swansea Tidal Lagoon project.

In January 2016, he purchased the Hilton Hotel in Newport, which has since undergone significant renovation, and has been incorporated into the Celtic Manor Resort Collection as the Coldra Court Hotel.

== Philanthropy ==
Matthews founded the Wesley Clover Foundation, a not-for-profit, philanthropic corporation that supports entrepreneurship, healthcare, education, and community initiatives. The foundation leased the properties formerly known as the Nepean National Equestrian Park and the Ottawa Municipal Campground to create Wesley Clover Parks. Matthews hosts an annual gala, Lumière, that has raised over $1 million for charity.

== Honours ==
Matthews was appointed an Officer of the Order of the British Empire (OBE) in the 1994 Birthday Honours for services to the communications industry.

In 1998, he was elected as a Fellow of the Royal Academy of Engineering (FREng).

On 16 June 2001, he was made a Knight Bachelor in the 2001 Birthday Honours for services to Industry and to Wales.

Matthews has received honorary doctorates from the University of Wales (Glamorgan and Swansea), Carleton University. and the University of Bath in 2006.

In 2011, he was appointed patron of the Cancer Stem Cell Research Institute at Cardiff University.

In December 2017, he was appointed an Officer of the Order of Canada (OC) in the 2018 Canadian honours, for his achievements as a high-tech entrepreneur and investor, and for his contributions to community development through charitable endeavours. He was invested by the Governor General of Canada in November 2018.

In 2026, the City of Ottawa awarded Matthews the key to the city.

== Personal life ==
His daughter Karen is executive director at Wesley Clover Parks. His son Owen lives in Victoria, British Columbia, is a general partner at Wesley Clover, and is founder and chairman of the Alacrity Foundation. His youngest son Trevor is an actor, founder and CEO of Brookstreet Pictures.

== See also ==
- List of Canadians § Businesspeople and entrepreneurs
- List of Canadians by net worth
- List of people from Ottawa
- List of Welsh people § Entrepreneurs
