= Nokia Life =

Nokia Life, earlier Ovi Life Tools and Nokia Life Tools, was an SMS based, subscription information service designed for the "Next Billion Users" in emerging markets, and offers a wide range of information services covering healthcare, agriculture, education and entertainment. The project began with Nokia's Emerging Market's Anand Narang and Jawahar Kanjilal, wherein they worked with BCG to identify the services for consumers in emerging markets to expand Nokia's footprint and drive long-term loyalty. The team then carried on consumer research, insights generation, proposition development & concept definition for the "Next Billion Consumers". Post Board approval, Nokia teams led by Jawahar Kanjilal, Anand Narang and Hemant Madan created a suite of services, branding, distribution, piloting, pricing & digital subscriptions business model for the Bottom of the Pyramid (BoP) consumers, because of the significant brand- and distribution presence that it already had in those markets at that time. The Nokia Life Tools was borne out of first hand market visits to small towns and villages in China, India, Nigeria, Indonesia, Egypt, Brazil and Ukraine to name a few, where Anand and Jawahar noticed that consumers didn't have access to relevant, timely and useful information in areas like healthcare, education and agriculture for their children and families. In addition, Nokia started facing competition from the cheaper Chinese and Indian companies. To build loyalty amongst existing customers and provide a genuine life-enhancing and well-being service, a suite of Nokia Life Tools was borne. These services when introduced brought life-changing experiences in Nokia customers' lives. The service has been available in India, China, Indonesia, Nigeria and Pakistan. Around 125 million people have experienced Nokia Life services in these five countries. In 2013 Nokia Life was eliminated due to Nokia's switch in focus and the arise of Internet-based information services in those markets.

Nokia Life was launched as Mera Nokia, in the state of Maharashtra in India in early 2009. After the successful pilot, a wider commercial deployment of the service under the name Nokia Life Tools began in India in June 2009. The service was later expanded to Indonesia in November 2009, China in May 2010, and Nigeria in November 2010. Nokia Life was able to use the existing distribution network of Nokia by pre-installing it on Nokia devices. The first two supported devices were the Nokia 2323 Classic and Nokia 2330 Classic devices.

== Customer-centric approach ==
Nokia Life was precursor of the customer-centric approach. Customer studies in the form of pilots, surveys, observation, and prototyping were used as input and testing for both the product design and the business model. Consequently, the trick was to scale the service to a personal content level to address multiple micro segments. Affordability is one of the most important challenges to overcome when targeting the Bottom of the Pyramid. The customer-centric approach contributed to achieving affordability by ensuring that Nokia Life invested time and money in activities and elements that were most relevant for the targeted customer segments. Therefore, Nokia Life operated on a local level with locally-insights driven teams. The service has been built from the ground-up based on the insights that local teams were gathering about each specific market in order to overcome the paradox of distance by adjusting the product or service to the local needs in order to increase the fit with the customer segment. The unit was headed by Jawahar Kanjilal, Global Head for Nokia Life. The languages were also adjusted to local preferences. For example, the services in India supported 11 local languages. (Hindi, Marathi, Gujarati, Tamil, Bengali, Telugu, Punjabi, Kannada, Malayalam, Assamese and Oriya).

== Value Proposition ==
Basically, Nokia Life helped people to make decisions at one specific moment in time. Therefore, it had to make sure that it created value by providing the right content for that decision, and delivering the value at that specific moment in time. For example, the agricultural part of the service consists of localized information including weather conditions, advice about crop cycles, general tips and techniques, as well as market prices for crops. Farmers in the pilot scheme said getting daily prices on their phones reduced their dependency on agents for basic information, enabling them to negotiate with greater confidence. The relevance of the service is described in an anecdote from the former Strategic Manager: "One of our customers was a farmer who had a son that drove all day around on his bicycle to visit markets and determine the market prices. At the end of the day, when the farmer was loading his crops, the son gave this information to his father so that he knew what price he could ask for his crop". The proposition from Nokia Life was built around how it could improve people's live and livelihoods.

Furthermore, the educational tools provide simple English and general knowledge courses in local languages, as well as study modules in a variety of state and ICSE board topics, including history, geography, biology, physics and chemistry. In India, it also includes a service that allows students to retrieve their exam results through their NLT app.

The healthcare services offers pregnancy and childcare advice, men's health, and women's health in all countries. There is also a range of health topics like respiratory, heart, diabetes, hepatitis and digestive health which are specific to some countries.

Finally, the entertainment services suite offering varies regionally and includes among others cricket & football scores, news, wallpapers, astrology, and ringtones.

== 'A rupee a day kind of service' ==
People at the BoP find a cost of ownership structure that matches their disposable income more important than the total amount of money that has to be paid at the end of the cycle. Consequently, Nokia Life was aiming for a rupee a day kind of service. The price differentiated per country, but was always between $0.50 and $1.00 per month. The former CEO explains the degree of affordability of Nokia Life: "One rupee will not even get you a cigarette, so people should value the service more than a cigarette".

== Partnerships ==
Nokia Life included partners in their business model to complement each other in order to serve a common goal. It built a platform that could reach specific segments while other parties were also looking to reach this segment with certain content. Nokia Life's need for content and the partner's need for a platform were combined. In return those partners were willing to bear costs in the form of sponsorships and to provide free content and resources. Partnerships included some services that were free to the end consumer and paid for by the partner (advertiser). Here the partner paid for a sequential engagement with the Nokia Life user. This sequential engagement unit (SEU) was offered to partners to help drive behavioral and attitudinal changes. These SEU's helped build the context and reinforce the messaging by targeted communication with the users over a specified time duration. The most critical partnerships involved content providers for free content (e.g. governmental organizations, NGOs, universities, content agencies), and Nokia and operators as distribution partners. The service provider included at first partners that were used to get the content and offering in place, and secondly go-to-market partners (operators) were included.
