= ShoreTel =

US telecommunications company

ShoreTel, Inc.
- Industry: Telecommunications
- Founded: September 1996; 30 years ago
- Defunct: September 25, 2017; 9 years ago
- Fate: Acquired by Mitel
- Headquarters: Sunnyvale, California
- Key people: Don Joos, CEO; Mike Healy, CFO
- Revenue: $359 million (2016)
- Net income: $12 million (2016)
- Total assets: $339 million (2016)
- Total equity: $202 million (2016)
- Number of employees: 1,158 (2016)

ShoreTel, Inc. was a telecommunications vendor providing unified communications for business. In 2017, the company was acquired by Mitel.

== History ==
In September 1996, ShoreTel was co-founded as Shoreline Teleworks by Edwin J. Basart and Mike Harrigan, both of whom were co-founders of Network Computing Devices.

In 1998, the company shipped its first products.

In April 2004, the company changed its name to ShoreTel.

On July 3, 2007, the company became a public company via an initial public offering.

On October 21, 2010, the company announced the acquisition of Agito Networks for approximately $11.4 million.

In 2012, the company acquired M5 Networks, based in New York City, for $146 million.

In August 2013, Don Joos became president and chief executive. He had joined ShoreTel in April 2011 from Avaya.

In August 2015, the company launched Connect Common UC Platform.

In January 2016, The company acquired Corvisa to provide SIP trunking and additional third-party application integration.

In February 2016, ShoreTel Connect Hybrid Sites was launched, a hybrid offering of on-premises and cloud services.

In August 2016, the company began looking into a sale of the company.

In September 2017, the company was acquired by Mitel for $530 million.

Mitel filed for Chapter 11 bankruptcy protection on March 10, 2025, listing assets and liabilities between $1 billion and $10 billion.

== Products ==
Because of ShoreTel's diverse ecosystem, they had many products to fit the various needs of that workspace and the end facing user. Below are categories that each product fits into along with the product's model number. All Desk Phones with a "G" appended to the model number have a partner version with gigabit ethernet functionality. This excludes the IP485G & IP655 as it only has the G variant.

=== Servers ---- ===
- UC Server 20
- UC Server 25
- UC Server 30

=== Voice Switches (ShoreGear Appliances) ---- ===
- SA100
- SA400
- SG220T1
- SG220T1a
- SG24a
- SG30
- SG50
- SG50v
- SG90
- SG90v
- SGT1k
- ST100a
- ST100da-T1
- ST1d-T1
- ST200
- ST24a
- ST2d-T1
- ST48a
- ST500
- ST50a

=== Desk Phones ---- ===
- IP100
- IP110
- IP115
- IP210
- IP212k
- IP230G
- IP265
- IP420G (New Generation)
- IP480G (New Generation)
- IP485G (New Generation)
- IP530
- IP560G
- IP565G
- IP655G

=== Special Phones ===
- IP930D, Cordless DECT, supports multiple phones on one base unit, optional extender unit available.
- ShoreTel Dock, An IOS device holder that emulates a phone from a tablet or phone.
- IP8000, Conference Phone
