= Office controller =

The office controller was a networking concept of the early to mid-1980s. The concept was used by PABX manufacturers as the basis of families of products in which the PBX would supply data connectivity and applications along with its traditional voice services.

The office controller would be a central switch which would link users to applications and provide necessary services such as security. There was much discussion at that time of multimedia voice/data services but the conception of these services was very vague. There was no real understanding of the utility and therefore customer value of these services. As a result, office controller services were usually restricted to various forms of modem pooling.

With the development of LANs and PCs, client/server became the dominant distributed application model, along with standalone applications as PCs became more powerful. As a result, the centralised model supported by the office controller fell out of style. Office controller products were withdrawn from the market. Remnants of the idea, with examples such as thin clients and three-layer architectures, did persist with some interest. However the thick client PC model of services was predominant in the 1990s.

However the office controller idea is not without merit. With the development of SIP with its session border controllers and service-oriented architectures, the centralized creation and management of user services is again finding widespread interest.
