= Aastra Technologies =

Former Canadian telecommunications company

Aastra Technologies Limited
- Type: Public company
- Traded as: TSX: AAH
- Industry: Telecommunications
- Founded: 1983
- Defunct: 2014
- Fate: Acquired by Mitel Networks Corporation
- Headquarters: Concord, Ontario, Canada
- Key people: Francis Shen, Chairman & Co-CEO; Anthony Shen, Co-CEO, President, & COO
- Revenue: ▲$834 million CAD (2009)
- Net income: ▲$45 million CAD (2009)
- Number of employees: 1,690 (2008)
- Website: www.aastra.com

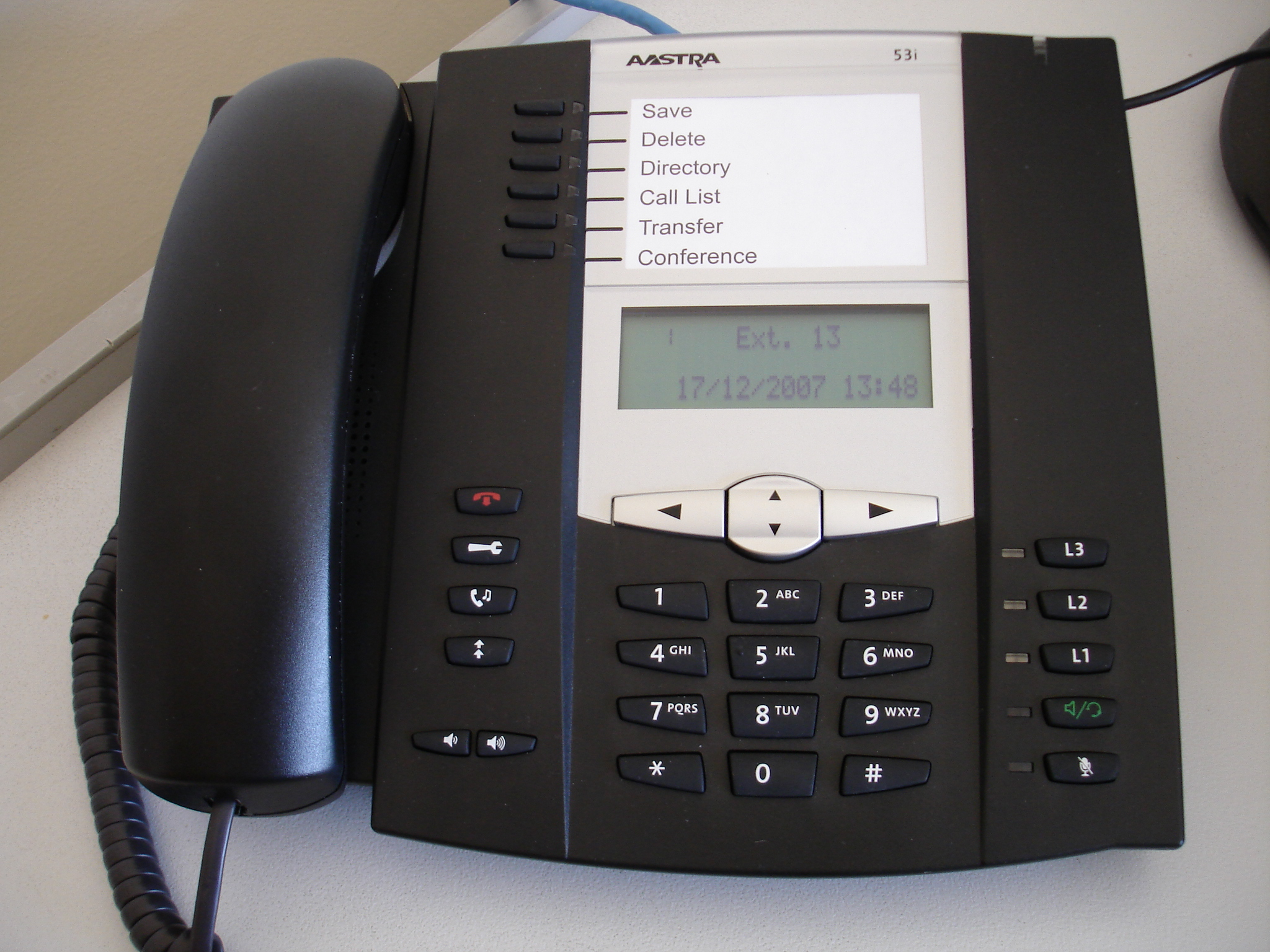
A VoIP handset manufactured by Aastra

Aastra Technologies Limited, formerly headquartered in Concord, Ontario, Canada, made products and systems for accessing communication networks, including the Internet. Its products included residential and business telephone terminals, screen telephones, Enterprise private branch exchanges (PBX), network access terminals and high-quality digital video encoders, decoders and gateways. Residential telephone equipment was sold in the United States as Bell equipment by Sonecor brand, which represented Southern New England Telecommunications.

Mitel Networks Corporation announced on November 11, 2013, that it would acquire Aastra Technologies Ltd. in a stock and cash deal valued at about $400 million.

== History ==
In 1983, Francis Shen and Hugh Scholaert bought an engineering consulting company, founding Aastra in Toronto in 1983. The company provided services to the defense industry. In 1993, the company started to specialise in telecommunications. Aastra went public in Canada in 1996.

In 2000, Aastra acquired the assets of Nortel Networks Access Solutions Division including the rights to manufacture phones under the Nortel name. Then, in 2001, Aastra acquired Lucent Technologies' Digital Video business and Ericsson Cable Modem. Aastra acquired Nortel CVX & CSG Division in 2002 and the ASCOM PBX System Division in 2003.

In 2005, 75% of Aastra Technologies' sales were made in Europe, following the purchase that year of the Germany-based the EADS Enterprise Telephony Business and the DeTeWe Telecommunication Systems business. Its other sales shares that year included 17% in the United States, and only 5% in Canada.

In 2008, Aastra acquired the enterprise PBX division of Ericsson, best known for MD110/MX-ONE Telephony Switch.

In January 2014, Mitel completed its acquisition of Aastra, which has been announced in November 2013. Mitel lists the fate of former Aastra products on its website.

== See also ==
- List of VOIP companies
