= Mitel =

Canadian telecommunications company

Mitel Networks Corporation
- Type: Private
- Traded as: Nasdaq: MITL (2010-2018) TSX: MNW (2012-2018)
- Industry: Telecommunications
- Founded: June 8, 1973; 53 years ago
- Founders: Michael Cowpland; Terry Matthews
- Headquarters: Ottawa, Ontario, Canada
- Area served: Worldwide
- Key people: Mike Robinson (president and CEO)
- Products: Mitel Products Page
- Revenue: ▲CA$1.27 billion (2025)
- Number of employees: 4,200 (2025)
- Subsidiaries: Unify
- Website: www.mitel.com

Mitel Networks Corporation is a Canadian telecommunications company. The company previously produced TDM PBX systems and applications, but after a change in ownership in 2001, now focuses almost entirely on Voice-over-IP (VoIP), unified communications, collaboration and contact center products. Mitel is headquartered in Ottawa, Ontario, Canada, with offices, partners and resellers worldwide.

In April 2018, the company announced it had been bought by an investor group led by Searchlight Capital Partners. In March 2025, the ownership of Mitel shifted from Searchlight Capital Partners to its lenders.

== History ==
=== Founding ===
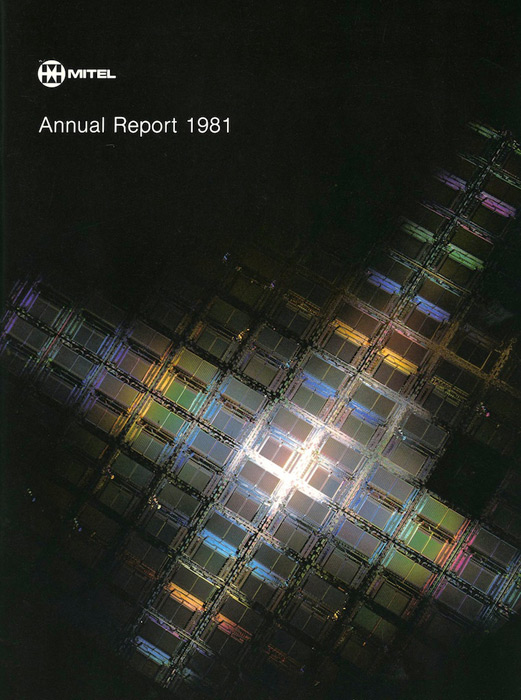
Cover of the 1981 Mitel annual report

Michael Cowpland and Terry Matthews founded Mitel in 1973 (officially on June 8, 1973). Conventionally, its name is regarded as a combination of the founders’ first names and their first product, Mike and Terry Lawnmowers. Michael Cowpland stated that the name stands for Mike and Terry Lawnmowers, whereas Terry Matthews confirmed the lawnmower acronym during an interview on BBC Radio 4's The Bottom Line in May 2011.

Cowpland and Matthews formed the corporation with the blessing of their employer, Bell Northern Research, in order to protect their intellectual property rights of the converter design from their employer, who otherwise would have legal ownership rights.

Their first shipment of three lawnmowers was lost in shipping, so they quickly adjusted to produce a telephony tone receiver product (a tone-to-pulse converter for central office use based on Cowpland's Ph.D. thesis). Michael Cowpland has also stated that the lawnmowers were not suited to Canadian lawns.

Following the success of the tone receiver, the founders extended their interest in the telecommunications industry. Early on, the pair realized the significance of the then-new microprocessor and software technology to the design of telecom switches. In 1975, they introduced the SX200 PBX. In 1976, the company expanded into the semiconductor field with the acquisition of Siltex, a bankrupt ISO-CMOS foundry in Bromont, Quebec. This evolved into a semiconductor division that specialized in mixed signal and thick film hybrid devices. The company grew at a rate of over 100% per year for several years. They reached the $100 million annual revenue mark by 1981.

=== 1980 - 2000 ===
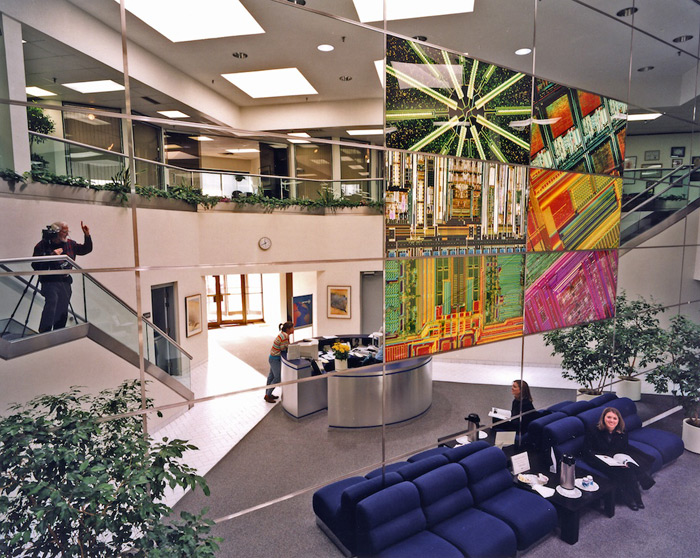
The lobby area of the Mitel office in the early 1980s

The next major product was a large digital PBX called the SX2000. This was an early attempt to integrate the voice and data functions of office systems. It was conceived as moving beyond the PBX to become an Office Controller, which would handle both voice and data applications within an organization.

In 1985, due to a financial crisis in the company, the board of directors created enough new shares to sell a controlling interest (51%) to British Telecom. British Telecom left the equipment business a few years later and sold its controlling interest in Mitel to an investment company called Schroder Ventures. Schroeder Ventures installed new management, which revitalized the company.

In the meantime, Mitel continued to diversify its product line, introducing the successful SUPERSET line of phone terminals, the GX5000 Central Office, and the SMART-1 call controller, among others. Additionally, Mitel developed and marketed a line of telecom-focussed semiconductor products.

=== 2000 - 2010 ===
In 2001, Terry Matthews paid US$230 million to acquire the communications network division of Mitel, along with the Mitel trademark. It began a new chapter, under the name Mitel Networks, by developing a family of PBXs based on Internet standards for Voice over IP (VoIP).

The original company retained the semiconductor division. It was renamed Zarlink (Tsar of Links) Semiconductor to reflect its interest in networking.

Mitel Knowledge Corporation, also controlled by Matthews, was incorporated in 2001. Numerous patents were transferred to the company. It later evolved into MKC Networks, which made a family of SIP-based IP PBX systems.

An additional split took place in 2002, when the manufacturing arm was spun off out of Mitel Networks to become a contract manufacturer called BreconRidge. With these developments, the original Mitel Corporation was split into three companies: Zarlink (which though renamed is the original corporate entity), Mitel Networks, and BreconRidge.

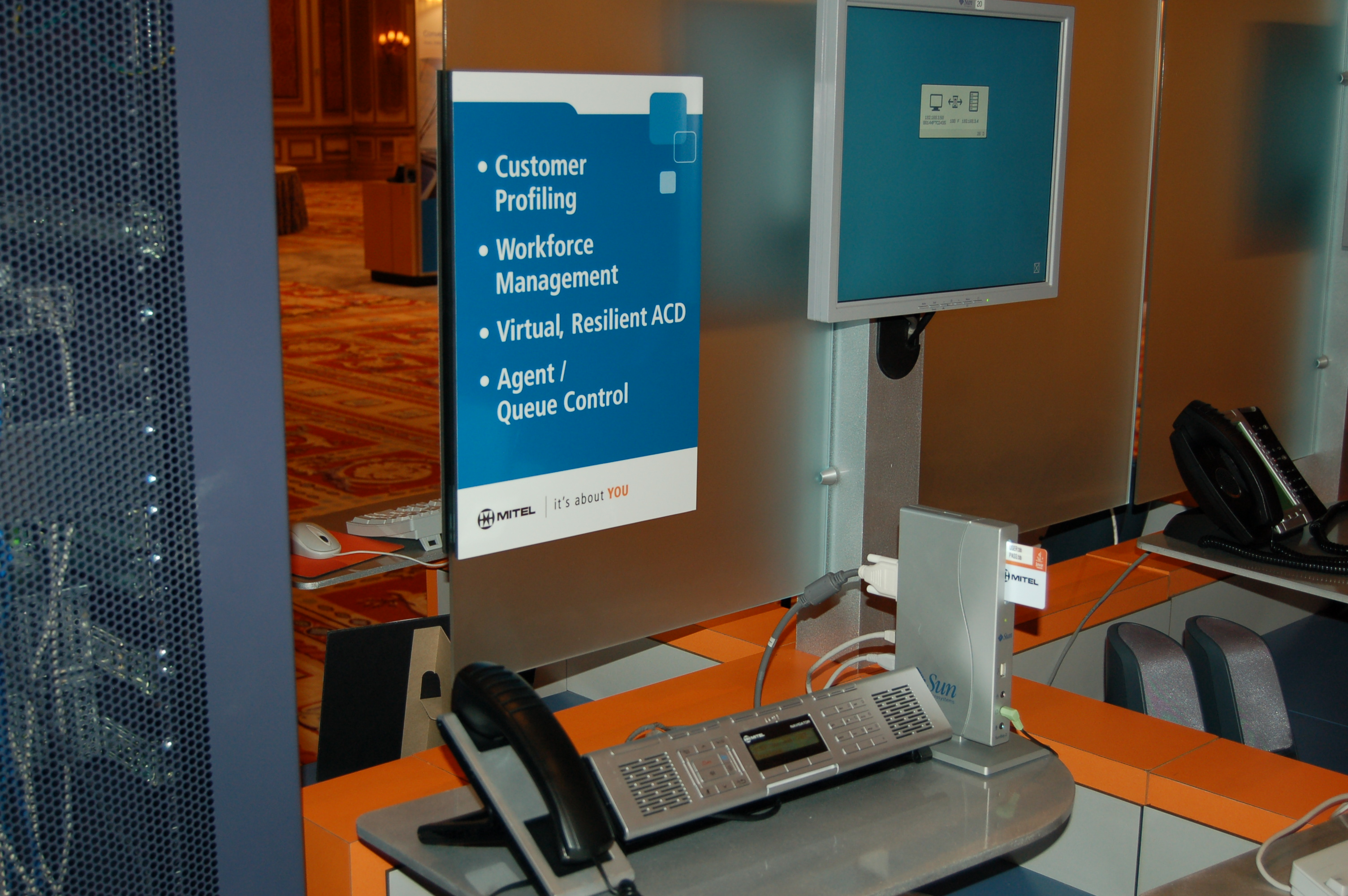
Mitel and Sun Microsystems equipment showcased at a 2007 trade show

On May 10, 2006, the new company announced its intention to launch an Initial public offering (IPO). No detailed information was released, but the press indicated that the company hoped to raise $150 million.

In April 2007, Mitel announced an agreement with Inter-Tel to purchase that company. This purchase would amount to a merger of equals, with the merged company being twice the size of the original Mitel. This acquisition was completed in August 2007. Management had announced that the companies will carry on under the name Mitel. As a result of the merger, Mitel withdrew from the IPO registration process.

On April 22, 2010, Mitel became a public company, listed on Nasdaq with the symbol MITL, and its initial offering stood at $14 per share. Within a year, the stock price had dropped to $5.50 and was described by CNBC's Jim Cramer as one of the worst IPOs of the year. Cramer blamed excessively optimistic pricing, excessive debt and the fear that company insiders would sell, dropping the stock value.

During the company's Q1 conference call, Don Smith (CEO) announced his retirement from the company once the board of directors was able to find a suitable replacement. Smith said he would remain on the board after retirement.

=== 2011 - 2020 ===
In 2011, Mitel launched litigation against at least two Australian businesses for infringing on Mitel's trademark and the businesses for engaging in misleading or deceptive conduct under Australian consumer law. The first case against Melbourne telecommunications company MyTel was resolved.

On March 1, 2013, Mitel announced it had completed the sale of its DataNet CommSource business unit ("DataNet") in Sioux Falls to EarthBend, LLC. In December 2016 the company announced that it had sold its mobility unit for $385 million to Xura and that would focus its business on Unified Communications.

In June 2013, Mitel announced the completion of acquisition of one of its key suppliers, prairieFyre Software Inc., a privately held global provider of contact center, business analytics, and workforce optimization software and services. The net cash cost to Mitel for the acquisition of prairieFyre was approximately $20 million. prairieFyre was an original equipment manufacturer (OEM) that supplied Mitel with its existing contact center solution.

In November 2013, Mitel announced the purchase of Aastra Technologies.

On March 4, 2014, Mitel announced the acquisition of contact center supplier OAISYS.

In March 2015, Mitel announced to buy Mavenir Systems for $560 million.

In April 2016, Mitel announced its intention to buy Polycom for $1.96 billion. The deal was intended to give existing Polycom shareholders both cash and new Mitel shares for their holdings and result in Polycom shareholders owning 60% of the combined company. The acquisition was ended in favour of a merger with Siris Capital instead, forcing Polycom to pay a US$60 million fee to Mitel for cancelling the deal.

In July 2017, Mitel announced they had reached a deal to buy ShoreTel for $530 million, increasing the size of the company to approximately 4,200 employees.

Major League Baseball, in 2018, entered into a deal with Mitel to unify communications "between the press box, dugout, bullpen and video review rooms at every MLB ballpark from the Rogers Centre to Wrigley Field".

On November 30, 2018, Mitel announced that all the shares of Mitel were acquired by affiliates of funds advised by Searchlight Capital Partners. The shares ceased trading on the TSX and Nasdaq and were delisted.

In April 2019, Mitel moved to merge with Avaya. The merger did not go through.

In October 2019, Mitel's CEO Richard McBee resigned. Mary McDowell became the new CEO.

=== 2020 - Present ===
In May 2021, Mitel announced a partnership with Five9.

In November 2021, Mitel and RingCentral entered into an agreement.

Tarun Loomba became the CEO in the same year.

In January 2023, Mitel announced it entered into exclusive negotiation with Atos to acquire Unify. The acquisition of Unify was completed in October 2023.

On March 5, 2025, Mitel reported it was preparing to file for Chapter 11 bankruptcy as soon as the following week, citing that its debt was quickly losing value. Mitel filed for Chapter 11 bankruptcy protection on March 10, 2025, listing assets and liabilities between $1 billion and $10 billion.

On June 20, 2025, Mitel exited Chapter 11 bankruptcy following the completion of its restructuring plan. As part of the restructuring, ownership transferred from Searchlight Capital Partners to Mitel's lenders, and Mitel reduced its debt by approximately $1.15 billion.

== Product lineup ==
Mitel's product portfolio includes the following products and services. Following the acquisition of Unify in October 2023, Mitel added the OpenScape and Unify product families to its portfolio.

Unified Communications & Collaboration

- Mitel's Zoom Hybrid Workplace
- MiCollab
- OpenScape UC
- Unify Phone
- Microsoft Teams Integration

Business Communications Platforms

- MiVoice Business
- OpenScape Voice
- OpenScape 4000
- MiVoice MX-ONE
- OpenScape Business

Advanced UC & CX Solutions

- Mitel CX
- Mitel Workflow Studio
- Mitel Workforce Optimization
- MiContact Center Enterprise
- MiContact Center Business

Devices & Accessories

- Mitel 6900 Series IP Phones
- DECT Solutions
- OpenScape Desk Phone CP Series
- Conference Phones

Critical Communications

- OpenScape Xpert
- Revolution
- Critical Event Management
- Virtual Care Collaboration Service
- OpenScape Alarm Response

Secure & Sovereign Hosted Cloud

- Mitel SecureCloud

Professional & Managed Services

- Mitel Software Assurance
