= Newbridge Networks =

Defunct Canadian voice and data networking company

Newbridge Networks Corporation
- Industry: Data and voice networking
- Founded: 1986; 40 years ago
- Founder: Sir Terry Matthews
- Defunct: February 2000
- Fate: Acquired by Alcatel
- Headquarters: Ottawa, Ontario, Canada
- Products: 4601A Network Manager; 46020 Network Management System; ACC routers; Alcatel 7470; MainStreet 36150

Newbridge Networks Corporation was founded by Welsh-Canadian entrepreneur Sir Terry Matthews in Ottawa. It was founded in 1986 to create data and voice networking products after Matthews was forced out of his original company Mitel. According to Matthews, he saw that data networking would grow far faster than voice networking, and he had wanted to take Mitel in much the same direction, but the 'risk-averse' British Telecom-dominated Mitel board refused and effectively ousted him. The name Newbridge Networks comes from Sir Terry Matthews' home town of Newbridge in south Wales.

Newbridge quickly became a major market player in this area using the voice switching and software engineering expertise that was prevalent in the Ottawa area.

The company initially had innovative channelbank products, which allowed telcos with existing wiring to offer a wide variety of new services. Newbridge also offered (for the time) the industry's most innovative network management (46020 NMS) and ISDN TAP 3500, RS-232C 3600 Mainstreet and ACC "river" routers (Congo/Amazon/Tigris etc.), including distributed star-topology routing through both proprietary software over the unused facilities' data links in optical hardware and telco switches.

Starting in 1992 the company became increasingly focused upon and well known for its family of ATM products such as the MainStreet 36150 and MainStreet Xpress 36170 (later renamed Alcatel 7470).

Newbridge later absorbed some routing technology that had been abandoned by Tandem Computers, with the purchase of Ungermann-Bass and entered the pure data networking market with a traditional routing and switching product. This was in addition to its internally developed ViViD product line, which was a network-wide distributed routing product (ridge or routing bridge—bridges with a centralized routing server).

Newbridge had 30% ownership of affiliate West End Systems Corp., which was headquartered in Kanata, Ontario, with R&D facilities in Arnprior, Ontario.

Newbridge was purchased and absorbed by Alcatel in late February 2000 for over $7 billion in stock. With this transaction, Matthews became the single largest shareholder in Alcatel.
