= Hazeldean Mall =

- Aerial view of Hazeldean Mall
- Coordinates: 45.302°N 75.878°W
- Address: 300 Eagleson Road; Ottawa, Ontario; K2M 1C9
- Opened: October 30, 1979
- Owner: Regional Group
- Num. of anchor tenants: 1
- Floors: 1
- Public transit: OC Transpo; 88, 161, 164, 168
- Website: hazeldeanmall.com

Hazeldean Mall is a shopping centre located in the Kanata district of Ottawa, Ontario, Canada. It is located at the intersection of Eagleson Road and Hazeldean Road, where Hazeldean Road turns into Robertson Road. It was the first enclosed shopping centre constructed in Kanata. The development of the mall was approved shortly before the incorporation of the (then) City of Kanata, and its approval led to a legal battle between the constituent parts of the new municipality over the appropriate location of what would at that time be the new city's main commercial hub.

== History ==
The site of the mall was zoned for commercial uses in 1962 at the time that the surrounding community of Glen Cairn was planned. The "Glen Cairn Shopping Centre" proposal was approved in 1978 by Goulbourn Township, only months before Glen Cairn ceased to be part of Goulbourn and was amalgamated with March Township and parts of Nepean Township into the new City of Kanata. March Township Council initiated legal action, ultimately unsuccessful, to significantly reduce the size of the Glen Cairn Shopping Centre development on the grounds that it would adversely affect the market potential for March's own Kanata Town Centre development proposal. March Township officials hoped that the Town Centre, located closer to the geographic centre of the new municipality than the Hazeldean Mall, would spur development of a new retail and office core for Kanata. The competing Town Centre project eventually obtained final approvals in 1980, after the Hazeldean Mall had opened.

The official opening of the Hazeldean Mall was October 30, 1979. It was anchored by Steinberg's and Towers, and also contained a TD Bank branch, liquor and beer outlets, and 50 other stores.

In the early 1990s, the Steinberg's chain closed, and was replaced by Your Independent Grocer. Around the same time, Towers was purchased by the Hudson's Bay Company which transformed many Towers stores, including the one at Hazeldean Mall, into Zellers stores. Drug City was also a major tenant during the 1980s, until it was replaced in the early 1990s by Pharma Plus.

Starting in the mid-1990s, the Kanata Centrum shopping area on Terry Fox Drive opened. With its big box store concept, the Centrum lured customers away from Hazeldean Mall. Toward the end of the decade, the mall underwent an extensive period of renovations, which completely removed the brick floors and wood panels, replacing them with much lighter coloured hues, and also installing a fountain. Pharma Plus expanded into the space formerly occupied by the TD Bank, also receiving a larger door leading directly to the outside.

== Current centre ==
The mall is currently anchored by GoodLife Fitness. Goodlife contracted to occupy the space formerly used by Towers, Zellers, Target Canada and Independent. In August 2019 Hazeldean Mall was purchased by Regional Group. On July 22, 2022, Laura's Your Independent Grocer closed and relocated to Elmvale Acres Shopping Centre, leaving GoodLife Fitness as the mall's sole anchor. However, on July 27, 2023, T&T Supermarket announced its intentions to move into the space formerly occupied by Laura's Your Independent Grocer, to open in the Winter of 2024.

== Transit services ==
The following routes serve Hazeldean Mall:

- Frequent route 68 operates 7 days/week. This route provides connections to the Kanata Centrum, Hazeldean Road, Bells Corners, Queensway-Carleton Hospital, Baseline Road and Algonquin College.
- Local route 110 operates 7 days a week. This route provides connections to the Innovation business park, Teron Station, Eagleson Station, YOW3 Amazon Fulfillment Centre, Barrhaven Town Centre and O-Train Line 2 in Riverside South.
- Local route 161 operates 5 days/week. This route provides connections to the Kanata Centrum, the communities of Katimavik-Hazeldean, Glencairn, Bridlewood, and the new Walmart located in South Kanata.
- Local route 164 operates during peak periods only. This route provides connections to the Kanata Centrum, Teron Station, Eagleson Station, and the new Walmart located in South Kanata. It also provides residents with connections to major streets as Campeau Drive, Eagleson Road, and Hope Side Road.
- Local route 168 operates 7 days/week. It provides connections to the Kanata Centrum, Teron Station, Eagleson Station, and the new Walmart located in South Kanata. This route also travels to the communities of Beaverbrook, Bridlewood, and Glencairn (weekends only).
