= Hartin =

Hartin may refer to:

== People ==
- Craig Hartin, American voice actor who played Rob Goldstein in Aqua Teen Hunger Force Colon Movie Film for Theaters
- Deborah Hartin (1933–2005), American lecturer and activist
- Jasmine Hartin (born 1988), Belize-based Canadian-American who pled guilty to the accidental shooting of Henry Jemmott

== Places ==
- Hartin Settlement, New Brunswick
- Hartin's Hotel, or the East India Company Restaurant and Conference Hall, historic building in Ottawa
