= Arbeatha Park =

Coordinates: 45°18′50″N 75°49′30″W

Arbeatha Park is a sub-neighbourhood of Lynwood Village, which is in turn a sub-neighbourhood of Bells Corners in the west end of Ottawa, Ontario, Canada. Bounded to the west is Moodie Drive, north is Old Richmond Road, east is Lynwood Village and south is a forest owned by the city of Ottawa.

The neighbourhood is the second area to be developed in Bells Corners from 1955 to 1958. Later in the 1970s more townhouses were built on Old Richmond Road. It is home to Arbeatha Park located on Arbeatha Street. A mosque called Jamiatul Muslemeen is on Moodie Drive. It was home to D. Aubrey Moodie Public School, which was Bell Corners' junior high school ranging from grades 6–8. D.A.Moodie Public School was closed in 2017.
