= Hartin's Hotel =

Historic building in Ottawa, Ontario, Canada

Coordinates: 45°19′30″N 75°49′36″W

Hartin Hotel
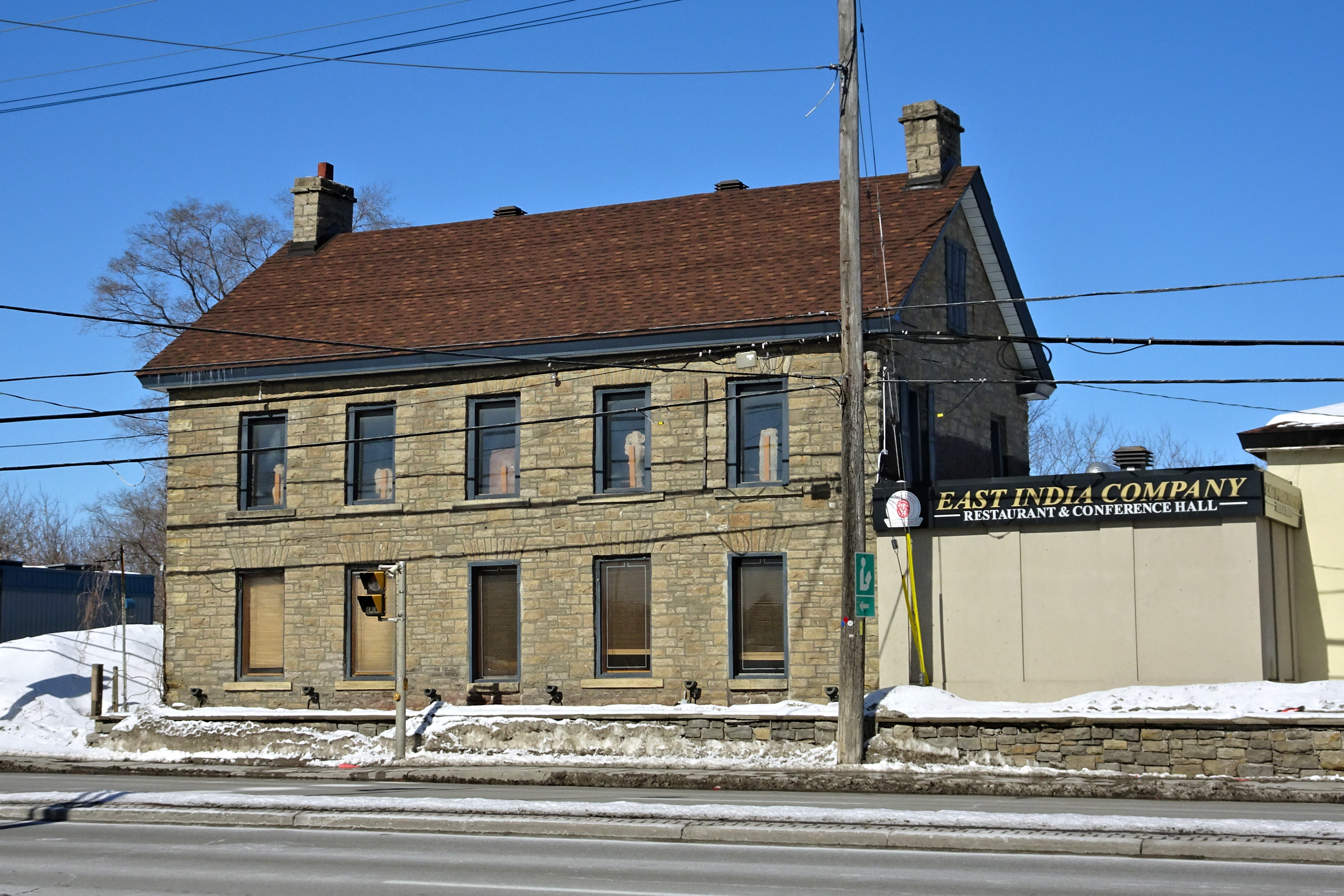
- The building in 2021.
- Interactive map of Hartin Hotel
- Type: Hotel
- Location: Bell’s Corners
- Nearest city: Ottawa

History
- Built: 1871
- Built for: David Hartin
- Original use: Hotel and tavern

Site notes
- Current use: Restaurant

Ontario Heritage Act
- Official name: Hartin Hotel, 3817 Richmond Rd (1993 Robertson Rd)
- Criteria: Rural, classically-inspired hotel
- Designated: 2015

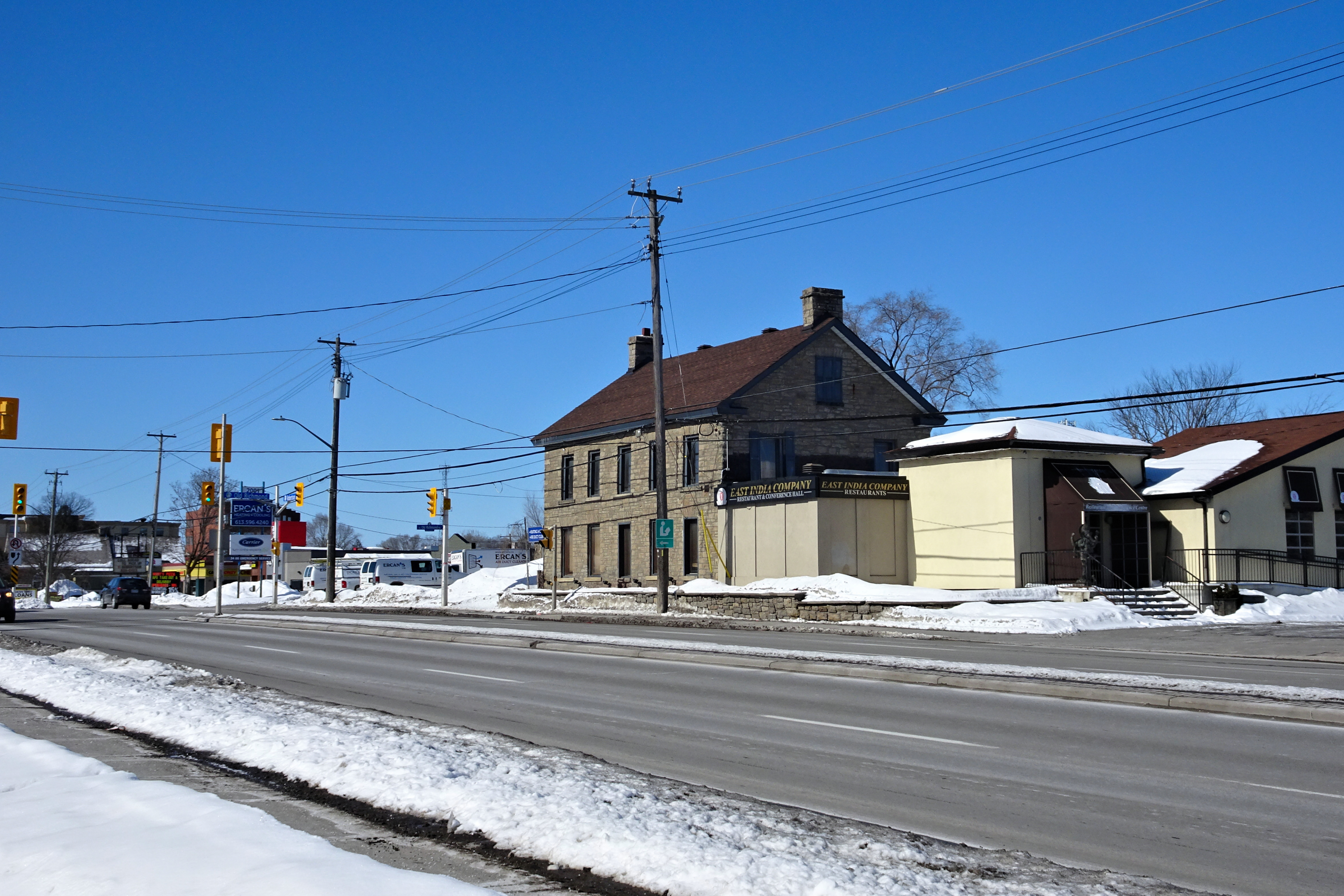
East India Company Restaurant at the intersection of Robertson Road and Old Richmond Road

The former Hartin's Hotel, currently the East India Company Restaurant and Conference Hall, is a historic building in the Bells Corners neighbourhood of Ottawa, Ontario, Canada.

== History ==
The two-storey building has a symmetrical facade, with a side gable roof, dressed limestone construction with decorative stone quoins and voussoirs.

It was constructed circa 1870 on the north side of what is now known as Robertson Road, at the intersection with Old Richmond Road. The two-storey stone building is the oldest building in Bells Corners and was constructed shortly after the Carleton County Fire of 1870 destroyed the earlier building on the site. David Hartin had acquired the former Malcomson's Tavern on 23 July 1870. The original building was destroyed by fire in August the same year. He subsequently rebuilt a larger stone structure on the site in 1871 and named it Hartin's Hotel. It still stands today as the home of the East India Company restaurant and conference centre. In November 2014 it was designated a heritage building by Ottawa City Council.

Constructed circa 1870 by David Hartin, the building replaced Malcolmson’s Tavern which was destroyed by the Carleton County Fire of 1870. The fire is still one of the largest and most destructive fires in the history of the Ottawa area. It started on August 17, 1870 when workers were cutting brush for the new Central Canada Railway line that was to run from Almonte to Pakenham. When the workers set fire to the cuttings, the fire spread rapidly. Twelve people were killed in the fire, including David Hartin’s mother, Mary Hartin, and hundreds of farms were burned. The Hartin Hotel was one of the first buildings to be constructed in Bell’s Corners after the fire. David Hartin was a well-known farmer and businessman in 19th century Goulbourn Township. He owned several properties including the hotel, two mills and the Goodwood Hall farm on Hazeldean Road, which still exists and is known as the David Hartin house.

One of the most important features of the Hartin Hotel is its contextual value. Located at the junction of Old Richmond Road and Robertson Road, the hotel was the first of three similar hotels located here, midway between Ottawa and Richmond. The hotel offered a stopping place for farmers and others travelling along the Richmond Road. The location plays an important role in understanding the development and evolution of Bell’s Corners from a rural farming community to a suburb of Ottawa.

== See also ==
- List of designated heritage properties in Ottawa
