= Bridlewood, Ottawa =

Bridlewood
- Neighbourhood
- Location within Ottawa
- Coordinates: 45°17′N 75°51′W
- Country: Canada
- Province: Ontario
- City: Ottawa

Government
  - MPs: Jenna Sudds
  - MPPs: Karen McCrimmon
  - Councillors: Erin Coffin

Area
  - Total: 6.404 km^{2} (2.473 sq mi)
- Elevation: 110 m (360 ft)

Population (2016)
  - Total: 24,400
  - Density: 3,810/km^{2} (9,870/sq mi)
- Canada 2016 Census
- Time zone: UTC-5 (Eastern (EST))

Bridlewood is a neighbourhood in Kanata South Ward in the western part of Ottawa, Ontario, Canada. Bridlewood was part of the Township of Nepean until 1978, and then part of the City of Kanata until 2001, when that city amalgamated with the City of Ottawa.

== Location ==
According to the Bridlewood Community Association, the neighbourhood is located east of Eagleson Road, south and west of the National Capital Commission Greenbelt, and north of Hope Side Road. As of the 2016 Canada Census, this area had a population of 24,400. This community is located in the southeast part of the former city of Kanata and is 12 km from the boundary of pre-amalgamation Ottawa proper.

== History ==
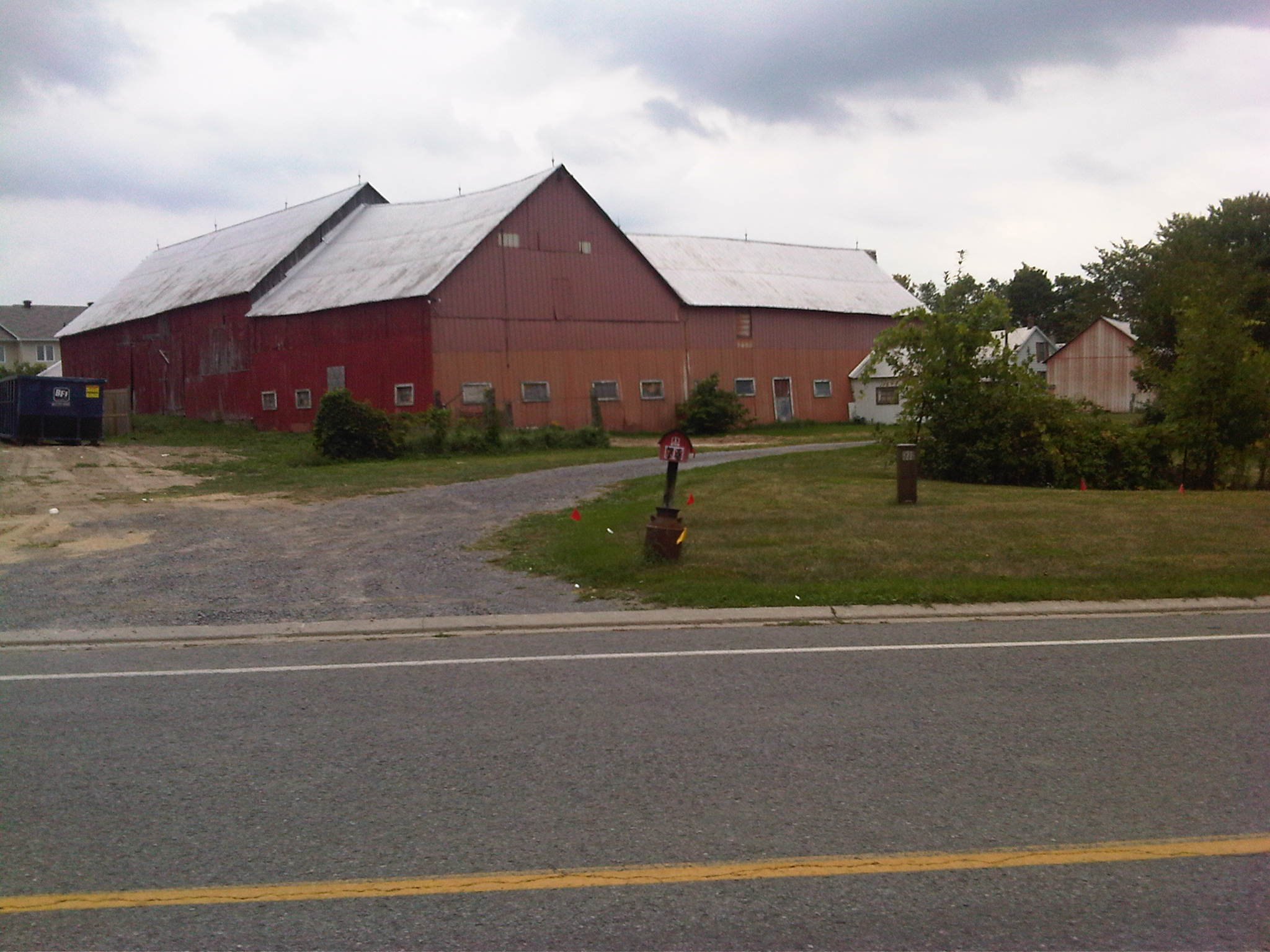
Deevy Farm, (Bridlewood, Kanata, Ontario, Canada) as seen from Equestrian Drive.

Bridlewood began to develop as a residential area in the 1980s in the northern part of the community. Previous to that, the land was used for agricultural purposes.

Most of the land that became Bridlewood was originally part of the Deevy farm, in the Township of Nepean. On December 1, 1978, Bridlewood was amalgamated into the new City of Kanata. The farmhouse and barn remained in the centre of the community just off Equestrian Drive until it was demolished in 2013.

In the early 1970s, Ontario Hydro installed a hydro line corridor through what would become the community, and in 1989 the voltage of the hydro lines was increased from a single 230 kV line to two (i.e., twin) towers with 500 kV lines. The Bridlewood Residents Hydro Line Committee (now defunct) opposed this change, citing concerns for children's health when exposed to electromagnetic radiation. The BRHLC struggle received national media attention, including by CTV's W5 and CBC's The Journal.

According to the Canada 2006 Census, there were 19,167 people living in Bridlewood. The 2011 Census reported 21,247 people living in Bridlewood. According to the Canada 2016 Census, 24,400 people were reported living in Bridlewood.

== Community ==
The Bridlewood Community Association (BCA) serves not only Bridlewood but the adjacent community of Emerald Meadows. The BCA deals with various community matters including sports, outdoor hockey rinks, garage sales, safety and security, business networking, traffic volume concerns, and developer and zoning activity.

Bridlewood is served by local councillor Erin Coffin as it is part of the Kanata South Ward.

== Sports ==
Sports participation is significant in Bridlewood. The BCA estimates participance of over 800 children for the 2007 soccer program. Bridlewood is a community participant in the True Sport movement, which is a Canadian program espousing goals of ensuring positive and meaningful experiences for sport participants.

== Schools ==
There are six elementary schools and one secondary in this area:

=== Public schools ===
- W.O. Mitchell Elementary School
- Bridlewood Community Elementary School
- Roch Carrier Elementary School
- Maurice-Lapointe Elementary and Secondary Public School (French)*

While W.O. Mitchell also functions as a middle school, serving students up until grade 8, Roch Carrier and Bridlewood Community only serve students up until grade 6. Students graduating from Roch Carrier and Bridlewood Community undertake their middle school studies at Glen Carin Public School in Glen Carin. Bridlewood students from W.O. Mitchell and Glen Carin upon graduation go on to complete their high school studies at A.Y. Jackson Secondary School, also located in Glen Carin.

=== Catholic Elementary schools ===
- St. James Catholic School
- St. Anne Catholic School
- Elizabeth Bruyere Catholic School (French)

Students graduating from St. James and St. Anne complete their middle school and high school education at Holy Trinity Catholic High School in Katimavik-Hazeldean.

== Notable residents ==
- Gordon O'Connor - Member of Parliament
- Erin Coffin - Ottawa City Councillor
