= John Gourlay =

John Gourlay may refer to:

- John Gourlay (soccer), Canadian soccer player
- John Gourlay (Scottish footballer)
- John Lowry Gourlay, Canadian settler and Presbyterian minister
