= Terry Fox Drive =

Major arterial road in Ottawa, Ontario, Canada

Terry Fox Drive (Ottawa Road #61) is a major arterial road in Ottawa, Ontario named for the late Canadian humanitarian, activist, and athlete Terry Fox. Located in the suburb of Kanata in the city's west end, the road is a major route for residents traveling to and from the north end of Kanata. Starting in the Kanata North Technology Park at an intersection with Herzberg Road, it crosses March Road and Innovation Drive and bisects an old-growth forest, before heading south past Kanata Centrum. It crosses Highway 417, passes Katimavik-Hazeldean and Glen Cairn, and ends at Eagleson Road, where it continues east as Hope Side Road. Terry Fox Drive is a four-lane arterial between just north of Richardson Side Road and just south of Winchester Drive, and a two-lane undivided road elsewhere.

== Features ==
Initially a minor road, Terry Fox Drive became a more important and busier road due to growing communities in Kanata and neighbouring Stittsville. The Kanata Centrum shopping complex, a Holiday Inn, a number of large-scale retail uses and Canadian Tire Centre (which began as the Palladium in 1996 and was later known as both the Corel Centre and Scotiabank Place) are now located along or near the road. OC Transpo's Terry Fox Station and Park and ride, which opened in 2005, are also located near Kanata Centrum.

Terry Fox Drive is also the location of the City Hall of the former city of Kanata, located just southwest of the intersection with Palladium Drive, before Kanata was amalgamated into the new City of Ottawa in 2001.

Kanata's second Wal-Mart (a Wal-Mart Supercentre) opened in August 2012, and is located at the intersection of Terry Fox Drive and Fernbank Road. There is a regular Wal-Mart in Kanata Centrum.

== Expansion projects ==
There have been several expansion and widening projects that have occurred. Mostly a two-lane road between Richardson Side Road, past the Highway 417 and Hazeldean Road, this section was later widened to four lanes. From 2000 to 2006 it was gradually extended to the south where it crosses Fernbank Road and now continues on to Eagleson Road. It has also been extended to the north towards Kanata Avenue.

Future expansion of Terry Fox Drive is controversial, with opposition from the Sierra Club, David Suzuki Foundation, Greenpeace, Robert Bateman and many residents because the road is planned to cut through a provincially significant wetland, affecting 20 species at risk in this area: including endangered species such as the Butternut Tree, American Ginseng, and the Blanding's Turtle.

The last remaining section of the Terry Fox Drive extension from Old Second Line Road to Kanata Avenue opened for traffic on 21 July 2011, finally connecting Kanata Lakes to Morgan's Grant. The remaining landscaping was completed and the official opening was planned for mid-August 2011.

== Speed limits ==
The speed limit through most of the southern section of Terry Fox Drive is 70 km/h (43 mph); however, for a small portion south of Glen Cairn, the speed limit is 80 km/h (50 mph). The section from the Richardson Side Road intersection past the South March Highlands Conservation Forest to the section in Morgan's Grant and the Kanata Business Park has a speed limit of 80 km/h (50 mph) and 60 km/h (37 mph). The speed limit in Morgan's Grant/Kanata Business Park is 50 km/h (31 mph).

== Neighbourhoods ==
- Morgan's Grant (northern and eastern segment)
- Brookside (across from Morgan's Grant)
- Kanata Lakes
- Katimavik-Hazeldean
- Kanata West (accessed by Maple Grove Road)
- Glen Cairn (accessed by Winchester Drive and Castlefrank Road)
- Fernbank Crossing (currently being developed)
- Bridlewood
- Village Green

== Major intersections ==
The following is a list of major intersections along Terry Fox Drive, from north to south:

- Herzberg Road
- Helmsdale Road
- Legget Drive
- McKinley Drive
- March Road
- Flamborough Way & Innovation Drive (formerly Goulbourn Forced Road)
- Old Second Line Road (formerly Second Line Road)
- Huntsville Drive
- Richardson Side Road
- Kanata Avenue
- Campeau Drive
- Roland Michener Drive (access to Kanata Centrum Shopping Centre)
- Highway 417
- Palladium Drive & Katimavik Road
- Maple Grove Road
- Charlie Rogers Place & Edgewater Street
- Hazeldean Road
- Halkirk Avenue & Winchester Drive
- Castlefrank Road
- Westphalian Avenue (access to the new Fernbank Crossing subdivision)
- Cope Drive
- Fernbank Road
- Overberg Way
- Eagleson Road

Terry Fox Drive continues east past Eagleson Road as Hope Side Road.

== See also ==
- Terry Fox Station
- Terry Fox
- Kanata, Ontario
- OC Transpo
- Morgan's Grant
- Beaverbrook, Ottawa
- Kanata Lakes
