= Bells Corners =

- Community
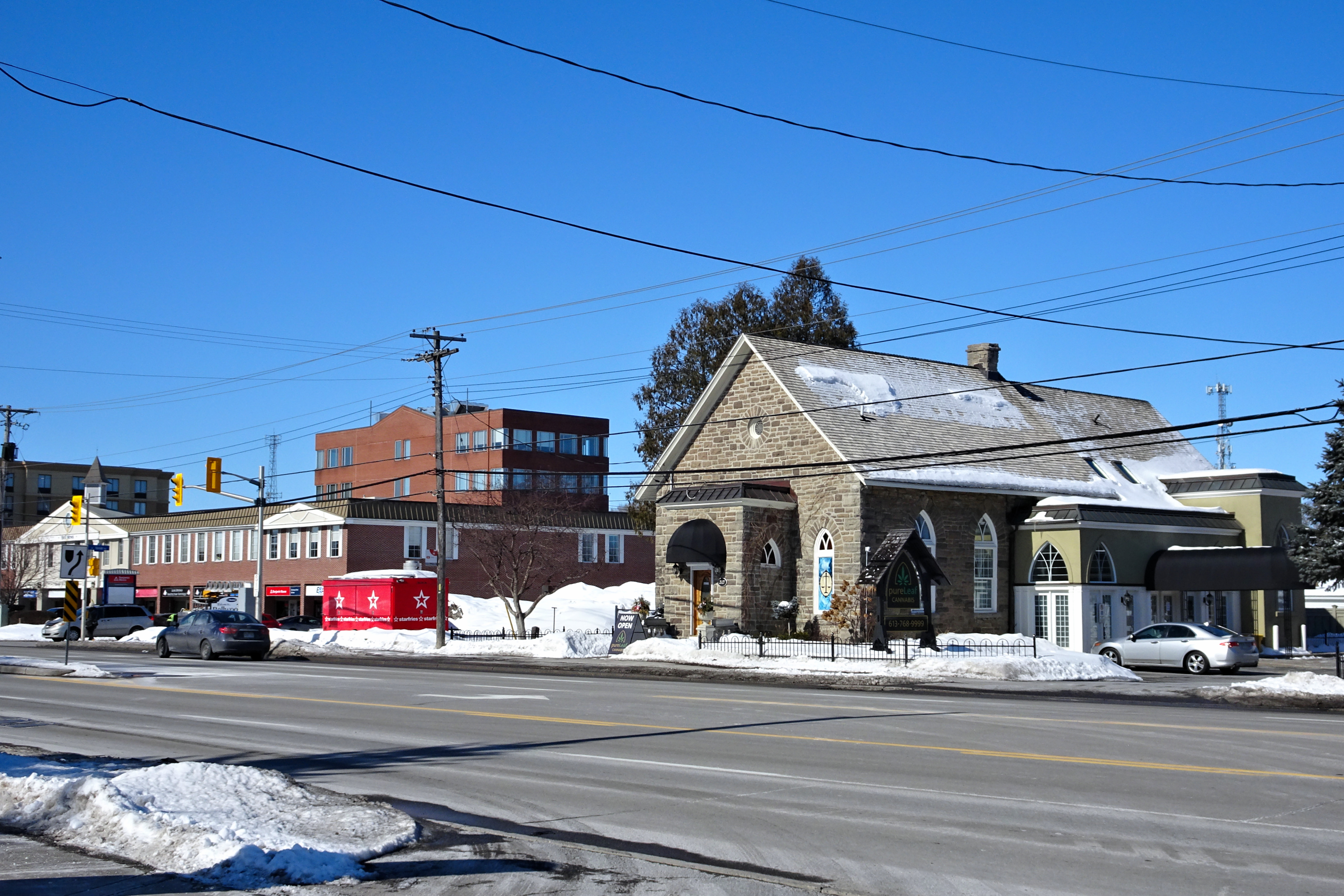

- Coordinates: 45°19′20″N 75°50′00″W
- Country: Canada
- Province: Ontario
- Municipality: Ottawa
- Bell's Corners: 6 August 1851
- Nepean Township: 1792 (incorporated 1850)
- Amalgamated: 2001 (City of Ottawa)
- Named for: Hugh Bell

Government
  - Mayor: Mark Sutcliffe
  - MP: Jenna Sudds
  - MPP: Tyler Watt
  - City Councillor: Laine Johnson

Area
  - Total: 4.66 km^{2} (1.80 sq mi)
- Elevation: 90 m (300 ft)

Population (2021)
  - Total: 9,385
  - Density: 2,013.95/km^{2} (5,216.1/sq mi)
- Time zone: UTC-5 (Eastern (EST))
  - Summer (DST): UTC-4 (EDT)
- Postal code span: K2H
- Area codes: 613, 343

Bells Corners is a suburban neighbourhood in Ottawa, Ontario, Canada. It is located along Robertson Road west of downtown, within Ottawa's western Greenbelt, in College Ward. As of the 2021 Canadian census, the community had a population of 9,385.

== History ==
Historic map of Bell's Corners

The community owes its existence to its location on Richmond Road midway between Richmond Landing near Bytown (now Ottawa) and the military settlement at Richmond, at the junction with the concession road leading west to the Hazeldean neighbourhood in neighbouring Goulbourn Township. It was also the junction between Richmond Road and the "base line" which was the boundary road between concessions on the Ottawa front and those on the Rideau front. Hence, the plural "Corners". It was named after Hugh Bell, who owned a tavern on the site of the present day Bells Corners Public School from 1834 to 1863.

Prior to that it was known locally as just "the Corners", but when the first post office opened on 6 August 1851 it had to adopt a formal name and became Bell's Corners. Today it is most commonly spelled without the apostrophe.

In 1832, there were nine taverns along this strip of road. Early stores catered to both local people and travelers.

In 1841 the Carleton County Agricultural Society was formed. It held its annual exhibition in Bells Corners until 1895, when it was moved to Goodwood Park in the Town of Richmond and later became the Richmond Fair.

In 1850, Bells Corners became part of Nepean Township, Carleton County. The Town meeting to elect the first Council under the new system was held at Bells Corners on 7 January 1850. Frederick Bearman, J.P., Chester Chapman, James Spain, John Robertson, J.P., Michael Grady were elected as Councillors. The first Council meeting was also held in Bells Corners on 21 January 1850, when Colonel Frederick Bearman was chosen Reeve.

By 1852, there were three taverns, three shoe shops, two blacksmiths, two carpentry shops, a new store, and a tailor.

The Union Church on Old Richmond Road was built in 1853 by the Anglicans, Methodists and Presbyterians on land donated by Hugh Bell, and is the present site of the Bells Corners Union Cemetery. It was the only building to survive the Great Fire of 1870.

The Canada Directory for 1857-58 listed the population of Bells Corners at about 70. It listed the following people:

- Arnold, George, postmaster, treasurer of township, and dealer in dry goods, groceries, hardware, produce, etc.
- Bell, George, farmer and reeve
- Bell, Hugh, hotel keeper, - a good house
- Burnside, Christopher, blacksmith
- Byers, William, lumber merchant and farmer
- Crow, Robert, shoemaker
- Davison, Samuel, deputy reeve
- Fannin, William H., teacher
- Gourlay, Rev. John, Free church
- Grahan, John, councillor
- Mahon, Edward, teacher
- Munroe, Donald, shoemaker
- Quinlan, Joseph, councillor
- Robertson, John, dealer in dry goods, hardware, groceries, produce, etc.
- Scales, Rev. W., Wesleyan
- Spittall, Alexander, blacksmith and carpenter,
- Stapleton, Thomas, clerk of township
- Taylor, Richmond, councillor

By 1867, Bells Corners was a post village with a population of 150 in the township of Nepean, county of Carleton, on the Ottawa and Nepean Macadamized road, 10 miles from Ottawa. The village had a daily mail, two stores, a school and a church which was used by the Church of England, Presbyterians, and Wesleyan Methodists. The early citizens included: Adam Abbott, a general merchant; Hugh I Bell, a farmer; George Arnold, a postmaster; E. Brown, a bailiff 7th Division Court; and William Brownlee, a general merchant boot & shoemaker.

In 1866, the 43rd Battalion of Infantry (otherwise known as the Carleton Blazers) was formed in Bells Corners with companies in many of the surrounding communities and absorbed Ottawa's volunteer rifle company.

By 1869, Bell's Corners was on the stage line from Town Ottawa to Perth. That directory listed the following individuals:

- Arnold, George, Postmaster and general merchant
- Bearman, James, J. P.
- Bearman, John
- Brownlee, William, shoemaker
- Corbett, William, hotel keeper
- Crowe, Robert, shoemaker
- Dawson, John, J.P.
- Dowler, Rev, J. A. (Wesleyan)
- Draffin, Richard
- Gourlay, Rev. J. L, M.A. (Presbyterian)
- Graham, Thomas
- Graham, William
- Harmer, F. W., Municipal Clerk
- Keeman, D., teacher
- Lafleur, Andrew, wagon maker
- Moodie, Robert, hotel keeper
- Patton, Henry, cooper
- Pettit, Rev. C. B., M.A. (Church of England)
- Pratt, A. D., teacher
- Pratt, Isaiah, shoemaker
- Robertson, John, farmer
- Spittall, Alexander, wagon maker
- Spittall, R. P., carpenter
- Wright, Albert, tanner

Most of Bells Corners was destroyed by the Great Fire in August 1870.

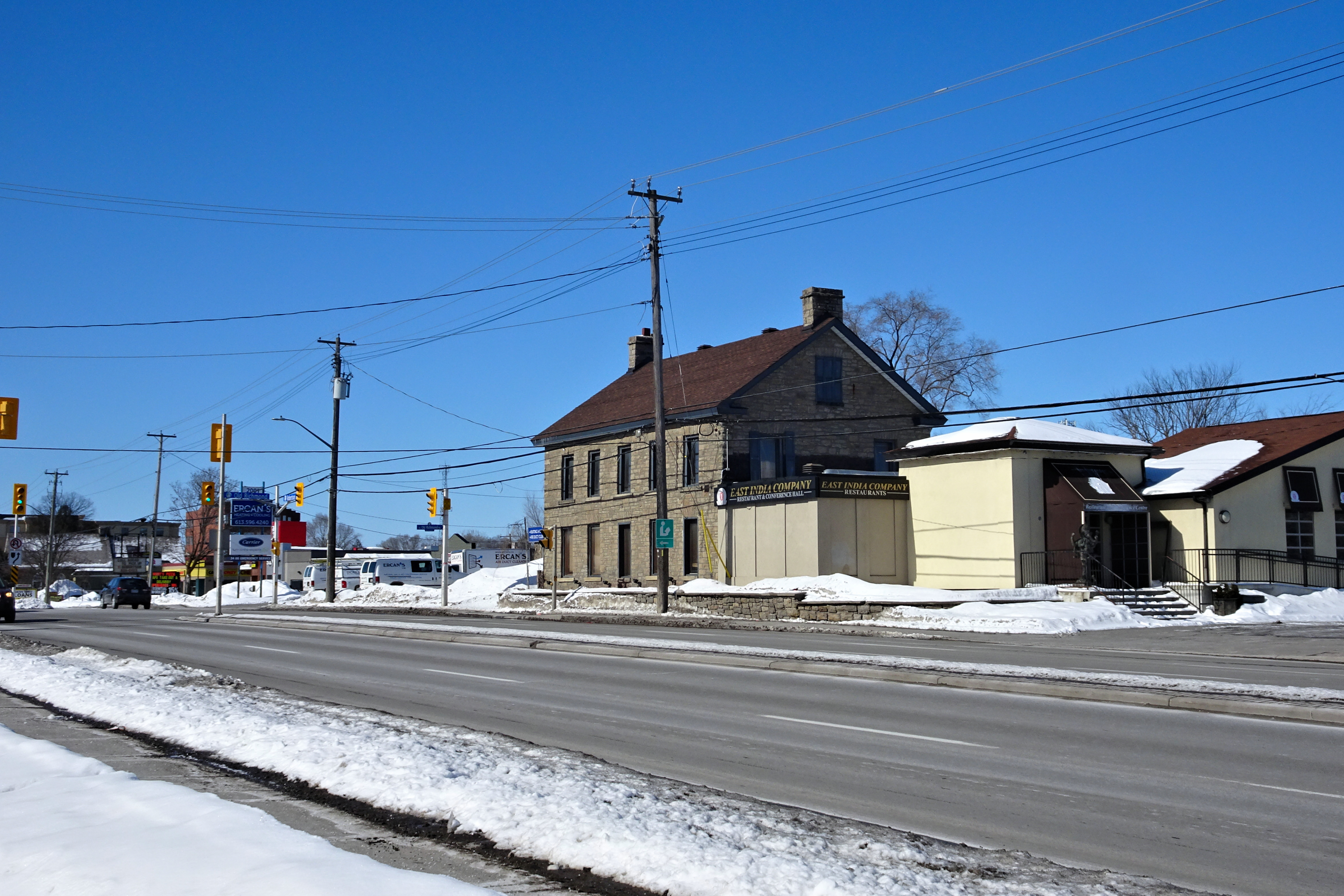
East India Company Restaurant at the intersection of Robertson Road and Old Richmond Road

The oldest buildings in Bells Corners are the former Hartin's Hotel, built after the fire in 1870 on the site of Robert Malcomson's Tavern, and the former Drummond Methodist Church, built in 1898 from stone taken from the old Union Church.

Some notable residents of the time:

- George Arnold - postmaster and owner of Arnold's General Store
- David Hartin - hotel owner
- John Foster - farmer, councilman; settled 1832
- Robert Moodie Jr. - tavern owner, hotel keeper; settled 1850
- John Robertson - general store owner
- Richard Shore - carriage maker; settled 1877
- A. Spittle - hotel keeper
- Stephen H. Waggoner - toll gate keeper
- C. J. Walker - farmer; settled 1878

History of the Ottawa Valley, J. L. Gourlay, 1896: -

John Dawson, nephew of the old bachelor pioneer, has taken a great interest in municipal affairs, and with his sons, has recently bought out the store of the late George Arnold, of pleasant memory, who had kept it for say fifty years. John Robertson began a store there, and one of his daughters kept it for some time. Kenneth McKaskill held it a time ...

=== Postmasters of Bell's Corners ===
Postmaster	Military status	Date of birth	Date of appointment	Date of vacancy	Cause of vacancy
George Arnold			1851-08-06	1891-10-21	Death
J.F. Arnold			1892-01-22	1893-05-30	Resignation
A.G. Dawson			1893-07-06	1909-04-06	Resignation
Mrs. M.A. Walters			1909-05-18	1916-03-30	Resignation
H.P. Leslie			1916-04-27	1918-03-02	Resignation
R.E. Williams		1881-04	1918-05-30	1939-02-11	Death
Miss Jennie Pritchard Williams		*	1939-02-11	Acting	-
Miss Jennie Pritchard Williams		*	1939-03-10	1945-04-03	Resignation
Mrs. Dorothy Ermen Potter		*	1945-05-09	1947-08-18	*
Donald Walter Plunkett	O.A.S.		1947-10-22		-

The post office was closed on 1 February 1963 when it became the Bells Corners substation (now Postal Station H) of the Nepean Post Office.

=== Campbell's Quarry ===
On the north side of Robertson Road between Bells Corners and Hazeldean was the first of several Nepean sandstone quarries from which rock was taken for the exterior of the parliament buildings, Confederation Building, Connaught Building and what is now the Canadian Museum of Nature. It can be seen also in many smaller buildings throughout the city. Dick Williams, a Welshman who came to Canada in 1902, opened a small quarry in the Nepean formation on the farm of his father-in-law on lot 3, concession II, Ottawa front. The two began making paving stones in 1912 and in 1916 they were joined by a young Scot, Archie Campbell, a recently apprenticed quarryman. The quarry eventually became known as Campbell's Quarry. Contracts were signed with seven different quarries, but the bulk of the stone for the Centre Block and the Peace Tower came from Campbell's Quarry. According to Campbell "Our first order came from Peter Lyall Construction Company for 1,000 tons of sandstone all for the Parliament Buildings. When we got the parliament job there were several hundred men on the job and they just gobbled up the stone. We couldn't get the stone out fast enough ... Stone was hauled up to the building site by teams of horses, struggling along poor roads with six ton loads. Each team could make but one trip a day." The quarry continued operation under various owners until September 1962, when the National Capital Commission expropriated the land for part of Ottawa's Greenbelt. Natural Resources Canada offices, laboratories and experimental sites now occupy the quarry and surrounding property. The workings of the quarry are reported to still be intact as they were when surveyed by Alice Wilson in the mid 1950s however the area is not open to the general public.

=== Transformation from post village to a suburban neighbourhood ===
In 1950, Ottawa annexed the main urban areas of Nepean Township including Westboro, where the town offices were located. A new town hall was then built in Bells Corners at the intersection of Richmond (now Old Richmond Road) and Robertson Roads where Arnold's General Store had been, which was used from 1966 to the late 1980s, when a new Nepean city hall was built at Centrepointe. The City of Nepean was finally amalgamated with 10 other municipalities into the City of Ottawa in 2001.

== Development ==
Once a rural community with many dairy farms, Bells Corners is now a residential, commercial and industrial island surrounded by greenbelt, woods and farmland. For a time Bells Corners was a hi-tech area and home to such Canadian technology icons as Computing Devices Canada, the Ottawa-based defence electronics company (bought by General Dynamics), which blazed the trail for later defence technology firms in what would become known as Silicon Valley North in neighbouring Kanata.

Many of the houses in Bells Corners are in a neighbourhood called Lynwood Village (Bells Corners East), built in the late fifties and early sixties. It is one of the first examples of tract housing in Ottawa. The first area to be developed was Stinson Avenue in 1950. This was followed by Arbeatha Park in 1955-58, and then Lynwood Village proper in 1958-66. In the fifties Nepean had acknowledged the rights of property owners to subdivide their land for housing but usually individual lots were sold to small builders. In Lynwood Village, land speculators Cyril Lloyd Francis and Donald Sim had assembled a vast tract of land. In 1958, they brought in Bill Teron to build the entire subdivision. By 1960, four hundred families lived in Teron's bungalows; another four hundred homes were built in 1961. Many more were built in 1962, 1963, 1964, and 1965. The last area of Lynwood to be developed was the area bounded by Richmond, Robertson, and Moodie Drive in 1966. Today there are over 1700 homes in the Lynwood area.

The magnitude of the shift to tract housing is demonstrated by the fact that most of the subdivisions built in Ottawa during the rest of the sixties were the work of three large firms (Minto, Campeau and Assaly/Johannsen).

To the west of Lynwood Village is Westcliffe Estates (Bells Corners West), founded in 1969, it is a growing community of over 2000 homes. Assaly Construction and later the Thomas C. Assaly Corporation built most of the older (1969–76) homes in this area. The Westcliffe community is characterized by significantly higher residential densities than other parts of Bells Corners. There is a multi-storey housing complex operated by Nepean Housing as well as a multi-storey senior's residence and a co-operative housing project. The Terrace Drive/Mill Hill area of Westcliffe Estates was developed in 1986.

Bells Corners has a reputation as a retirement community, hosting three retirement homes in Lynwood Village and another in Westcliffe Estates.

Bells Corners is also the home of Bellwood Estates (formerly the Bellwood Mobile Home Park), consisting of 256 homes. The park was established in 1959 by Ken Hughes. It is now owned and operated by Parkbridge Lifestyle Communities.

== Demographics ==
Historical Census Data - Bells Corners
Year	Pop.	±%
1991	9,573	—
1996	9,934	+3.8%
2001	9,723	−2.1%
2006	9,799	+0.8%
2011	9,468	−3.4%
2016	9,272	−2.1%
2021	9,385	+1.2%
Source: Statistics Canada

=== Religion ===
There are seven churches and a mosque in Bells Corners.

- Bell's Corners United Church
- Christ Church Anglican Bells Corners
- The Church of Jesus Christ of Latter-day Saints
- The Church of Pentecost Canada
- Emmanuel Alliance Church of Ottawa
- Jamiatul Muslemeen (Jami Omar) Mosque
- St Martin de Porres Catholic Church
- The Church of Hope

== Economy ==
Bells Corners is probably best known for the commercial strip along Richmond and Robertson Roads, which is dominated by car-oriented retail uses, gas stations, restaurants, strip malls, shopping plazas, and automobile dealers. In 2009, the City of Ottawa designated the strip a Business Improvement Area under the Ontario Municipal Act. Because of the residential development in neighbouring Kanata to the west, the strip is now a major thoroughfare for residents travelling to and from work within the city centre to the east. The amount of daily traffic, particularly during rush hour, can cause serious traffic congestion in Bells Corners. To the north of these roads lie the majority of commercial and industrial businesses, with most residential real estate located to the south. It is now proposed to build high-rise condominiums on this strip. There was some considerable controversy over renaming Richmond and Robertson Roads. In the end it was decided to keep the Robertson name for both. The change took effect in 2012.

== Recreation ==
Bells Corners has a tennis club, the Lynwood Park Tennis Club, which manages the courts for the City of Ottawa. The Valleystream Tennis Club is located nearby on Richmond Road. Bell Centennial Arena and two seasonal outdoor rinks provide facilities for skating and ice hockey. The arena is also used for lacrosse in the summer. There is an outdoor public swimming pool at Entrance Park in Lynwood and numerous soccer, football, baseball, softball and play areas in the nine public parks in the community.

- Arnold Park
- Entrance Park
- George Wilson Park
- Lynwood Park
- Priam Way Park
- Quinpool Park
- Trevor Park
- Westcliffe Park
- Williams Park

The City of Ottawa partners with not-for-profit community associations to provide a variety of programs and services in recreation, arts and culture, and sports. Three such associations have been formed within Bells Corners - the Westcliffe Estates Community Association, the Lynwood Village Community Association, and the Arbeatha Park Community Association. In Bellwood Estates there is a homeowners association that represents the interests of tenants of the mobile home park.

== Transportation ==
Although many bicycle paths exist to the east, west, and north of the community, they do not connect to each other and cycling on the major thoroughfares (Robertson and Moodie) through the community can be particularly hazardous. Pedestrians do not fare much better, as most of the community has no sidewalks.

Major roads which either serve or border Bells Corners include:

- 416 (Veterans Memorial Highway)
- 417 (Queensway)
- Baseline Road (Ottawa Road #16)
- Cedarview Road (Ottawa Road #23)
- Eagleson Road (Ottawa Road #49)
- Fallowfield Road (Ottawa Road #12)
- Hazeldean Road (Ottawa Road #36)
- Hunt Club Road (Ottawa Road #32)
- Moodie Drive (Ottawa Road #59 and Ottawa Road #11)
- Old Richmond Road (Ottawa Road #59)
- Robertson Road (Ottawa Road #36)

=== Railways ===
The Central Canada Railway was chartered to run from the Brockville and Ottawa Railway at Carleton Place through Bells Corners to Bytown. This line opened on 15 September 1870. This was a broad gauge rail line and but was converted to standard gauge in 1880. It was leased and then taken over by the Canadian Pacific Railway on 6 June 1881. The Bells Corners Station was located to the northwest of the community approximately where Fitzgerald Road is now located. In 1915, Canadian Northern Railway (later Canadian National) built its mainline from Ottawa to Brent, Ontario just to the northeast of the community. A new Bells Corners Station was built on Northside Road just west of what was then known as Cedarview Road (now Cassidy Road) and an overpass was built east of Moodie Drive where the two competing rail lines crossed.

On 28 February 1957 a Canadian National Continental train hit a tractor trailer at a Bells Corners crossing derailing two diesel units and ten passenger cars. There were only minor injuries to three persons on the train.

The junction between the two rail lines, Bells Junction, was not installed until 29 July 1966. On 28 August 1967 at 12:00 noon, CP Rail abandoned what was then known as the Carleton Place Subdivision between McRae Avenue in Ottawa and Bells Junction. The remaining portion westward from the junction was abandoned on January 15, 1990 and is now a part of the Trans Canada Trail from Fitzgerald Road to Carleton Place.

The CN line continues to exist only as far as Pembroke and is known as the Beachburg Subdivision. However, this once continental line has been abandoned and CN has removed all of the track between Nepean Junction and Pembroke. This line also served a portion of the Pontiac region in west Quebec. Ottawa Central Railway operated a short line providing freight service on this track from 1998 to 2008 when it was bought out by CN. To this day, there still remains one freight movement per week through Bells Corners on the Renfrew Sub. This train provides Caprolactam to Nylene Canada Inc. in Arnprior.

=== Public transit ===
Bells Corners

General information
- Location: Fitzgerald Road; Bells Corners, Ontario; Canada
- Coordinates: 45.3251°N 75.8356°W
- Owner: OC Transpo

Services
Preceding station	OC Transpo	Following station
Terminus	Route 57	Bayshore toward Tunney's Pasture
Location

Effective 4 September 2011, public transit service to Bells Corners was modified as OC Transpo re-organised many suburban routes. In these changes, Bells Corners made significant gains in accessibility to the centre of Ottawa, as the Transitway bus route 97 was extended from Bayshore to Bells Corners, providing half-hourly service directly from Bells Corners to downtown and South Keys Monday to Saturday, and hourly service Sunday. Route 88, the primary route in the community (every 15 minutes most of the day) which connects Bells Corners with Kanata, Algonquin College and Billings Bridge, also increases in frequency, particularly in rush hour. The rush hour connexion routes 252 and 256 that connect Bells Corners to downtown Ottawa saw slight reductions in service.

In the summer of 2011 an experimental bicycle taxi service was introduced within the community.

Starting in 2013, modifications are being made to the Robertson Road and Moodie Drive intersection to increase capacity for through traffic. A study is also being undertaken to consider widening West Hunt Club and Old Richmond Road immediately to the south of the community.

Service

The following routes serve Bells Corners terminus as of 6 October 2019:

Stop	Routes
#1385 Fitzgerald Rd. East	57

== Education ==
There are five schools in Bells Corners - a public and a Catholic elementary school, a public intermediate school, and a public and a French Catholic high school. Most students, unless they live quite close, take a bus to get to school.

Ottawa-Carleton District School Board

- Bells Corners Public School
- D. Aubrey Moodie Intermediate School (closed 2017)
- Bell High School

Ottawa Catholic School Board

- Our Lady of Peace Elementary School

Conseil des écoles catholiques du Centre-Est

- Collège catholique Franco-Ouest

== Wildlife ==
Bells Corners is an island, surrounded by Greenbelt and farmland. The area of the Greenbelt around Bells Corners is known as the Stony Swamp Conservation Area. It is the largest forested area of the Greenbelt and has a great diversity of trails with interpretive exhibits on the geology and natural history of the area. Those, combined with the many trails that lead from Bells Corners through other natural areas, such as the Trans Canada Trail and the Rideau Trail, provide it with a wide diversity of urban wildlife. Squirrels, snowshoe hares, raccoons, skunks, chipmunks, groundhogs, beaver, and foxes are all native inhabitants. A large deer population makes the Greenbelt home but they can often be found roaming streets and yards at night. Black bears have been sighted, as well as coyotes. There have been unconfirmed reports of a wolf in the area just to the west of Westcliffe Estates. In 2017, wild turkeys made an appearance in that area as well.

== Other ==
In 2010, Bells Corners was the location for the feature-length film Going Thru a Thing produced and directed by former Bells Corners resident Jo Marr. Bells Corners is the home of musician Tyler Kealey. New York-based jazzman and saxophonist Michael Webster is also a former resident of Bells Corners. Former NHL hockey star and general manager of the Detroit Red Wings Steve Yzerman is a former resident of Bells Corners where he attended Bells Corners Public School, D.A Moodie, and Bell High School.

Author Marion Voytinsky (Face Your Fears, CreateSpace Independent Publishing Platform, 30 June 2013) is a resident of Bells Corners. The cover of her book features the Bel Air Motel. Iain Reid's novel The Truth About Luck: What I Learned on My Road Trip with Grandma (House of Anansi, 20 February 2013) also references a Bells Corners motel. In the fall of 1956, the first meeting of Radio Control Model Club, later to become the Ottawa Remote Control Club, was held at the Monarch Motel in Bells Corners. Recently the remains of two other area motels were rediscovered in the Greenbelt just to the west of Bells Corners.

== See also ==
- Nepean Township
- Carleton County
- Nepean
- Ottawa
- College Ward (municipal)
- Nepean (provincial)
- Kanata (federal)
