= Robertson Road =

Arterial road in Ottawa, Ontario, Canada

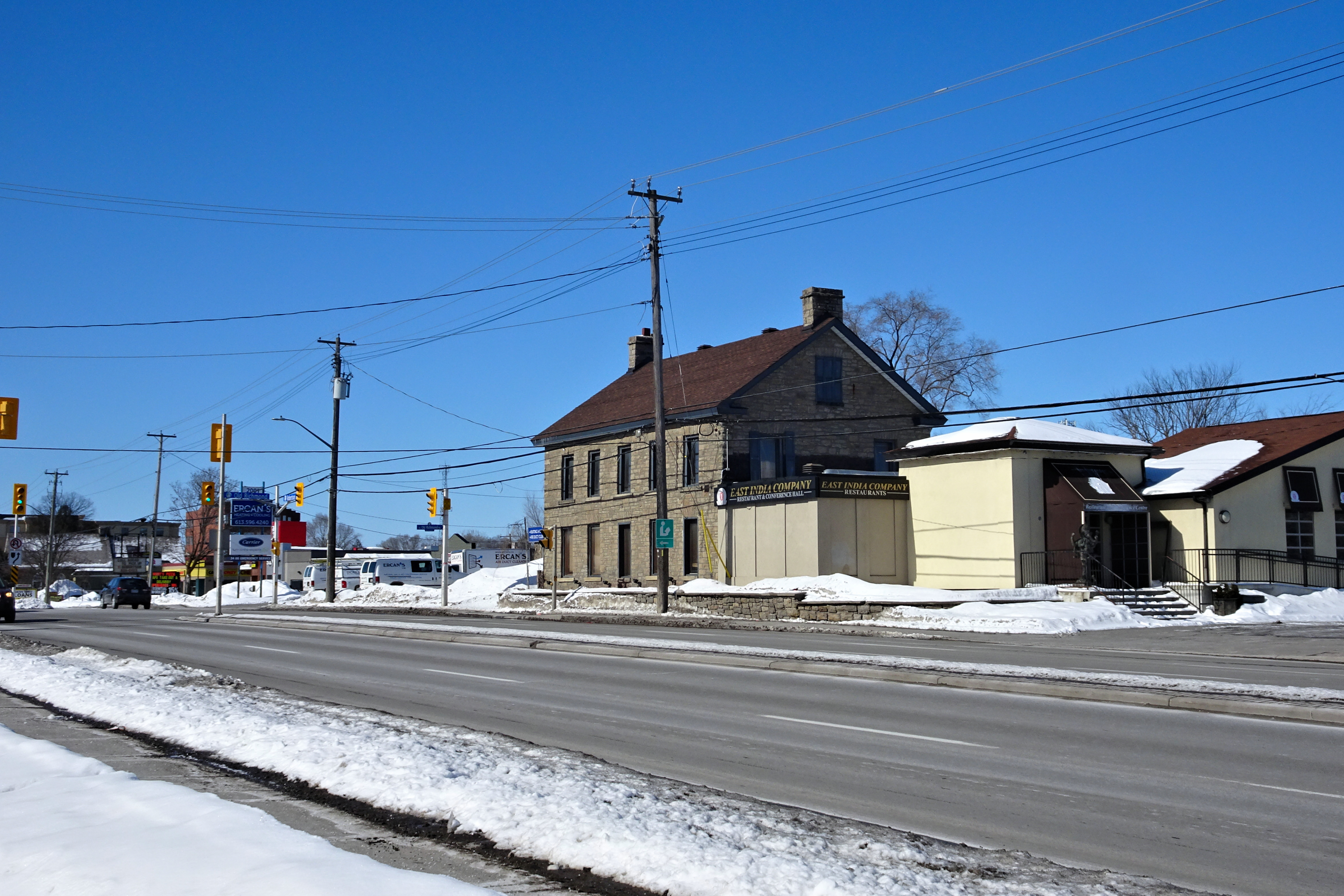
Robertson Road in Bells Corners

Robertson Road (Ottawa Road #36) is a road in the west end of Ottawa, Ontario, Canada. It runs approximately 6.1 km (3.8 mi) between Baseline Road east of Bells Corners and Eagleson Road in Kanata where the road continues west as Hazeldean Road. At Baseline Road it continues east as Richmond Road.

Robertson Road is a four-lane route along its entire length and the speed limit is 80 km/h (50 mph) except within Bells Corners where it is 60 km/h (37 mph). The route west of the old CP Rail trestle (now the Trans Canada Trail) passes through the Greenbelt and is designated as a high risk deer collision corridor. Numerous attempts have been made to reduce the risk, including reflective markers along the shoulder on each side of the road. Most recently, these have been removed and lighting installed.

Construction was completed in the fall of 2013 around the intersection with Moodie Drive. New storm sewers were installed and Robertson was widened from four lanes to six to ease peak period congestion. As well, the traffic lights at the Moodie Drive intersection were upgraded to have protected left turns for traffic turning from Moodie onto Robertson, as opposed to the unprotected left turns previously installed.

== History ==
Robertson Road was named for John Robertson (1797-1884), an owner of a general store in Bells Corners and "Surveyor of Roads" for the Township of Nepean.

Originally built as the concession road leading west to the Hazeldean neighbourhood in neighbouring Goulbourn Township, the road was named Arnprior Road because from there it headed northwest to the town of Arnprior. It was known colloquially as "Whiskey Road" for the number of taverns along its route. It later became part of Highway 7 and Highway 15 before the western leg of Highway 417 was completed, after which it was known for a time as "Old Highway 7 & 15". The name Robertson Road was established on September 28, 1983, by a Regional Municipality of Ottawa-Carleton (RMOC) by-law naming the portion of Highway 7 and 15, west of the now Old Richmond Road turnoff at Bells Corners to Eagleson Road.

== Renaming controversy ==
On 13 April 2011, Ottawa City Council voted to rename Robertson Road and a portion of Richmond Road after the late Cyril Lloyd Francis, a land speculator, former Liberal Member of Parliament and former Speaker of the House of Commons of Canada. The decision would have seen the name of Robertson Road and the portion of Richmond Road between Robertson Road and Baseline Road changed to Lloyd Francis Boulevard so the commercial strip in Bells Corners would bear a single name for its entire length. The Robertson name was to be preserved as the name of a park. Strong opposition from local residents and business eventually led to Ottawa City Council voting to rescind the decision and voting instead to extend the Robertson Road name east to Baseline Road instead, renaming only the portion of Richmond Road in Bells Corners. The changes came into effect on May 1, 2012.

== Major Intersections ==
The following is a list of major intersections along Robertson Road, from west to east:

- Ottawa Road 49 (Eagleson Road)
- Westcliffe Road
- Fitzgerald Road
- Ottawa Road 59 (Moodie Drive)
- Vanier Road (not to be confused with Vanier Parkway in the east end)
- Old Richmond Road (former eastern end of Robertson Road)
- Stinson Avenue
- Stafford Road & Lynhar Road
- Northside Road
- Ottawa Road 16 (Baseline Road)

The road alignment continues east as Richmond Road.

== Communities ==
- Lynwood Village
- Westcliffe Estates
- Bellwood Estates

== See also ==
- Bells Corners
- Nepean, Ontario
