= A. Y. Jackson Secondary School (Ottawa) =

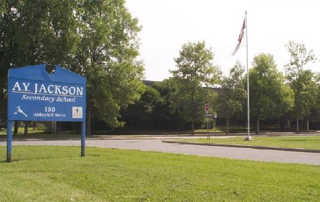
- A.Y Jackson Secondary school entrance (2009)

Location
- 150 Abbeyhill Drive; Ottawa, Ontario, K2L 1H7; Canada; 45°17′42″N 75°52′47″W

Information
- Founded: 1976
- School board: Ottawa Carleton District School Board
- Superintendent: Amy Hannah
- Area trustee: Julia Fortey
- Principal: Alain Brulé
- Grades: 9 to 12
- Enrollment: 820 (2022)
- Campus: Suburban
- Colours: Blue and White
- Mascot: Captain Feathers the Bluejay
- Team name: Jays
- Feeder schools: Glen Cairn Public School; Katimavik Elementary School; W.O. Mitchell Elementary School
- Information: School Hours: 9:15 - 3:20 School Days: Monday to Friday

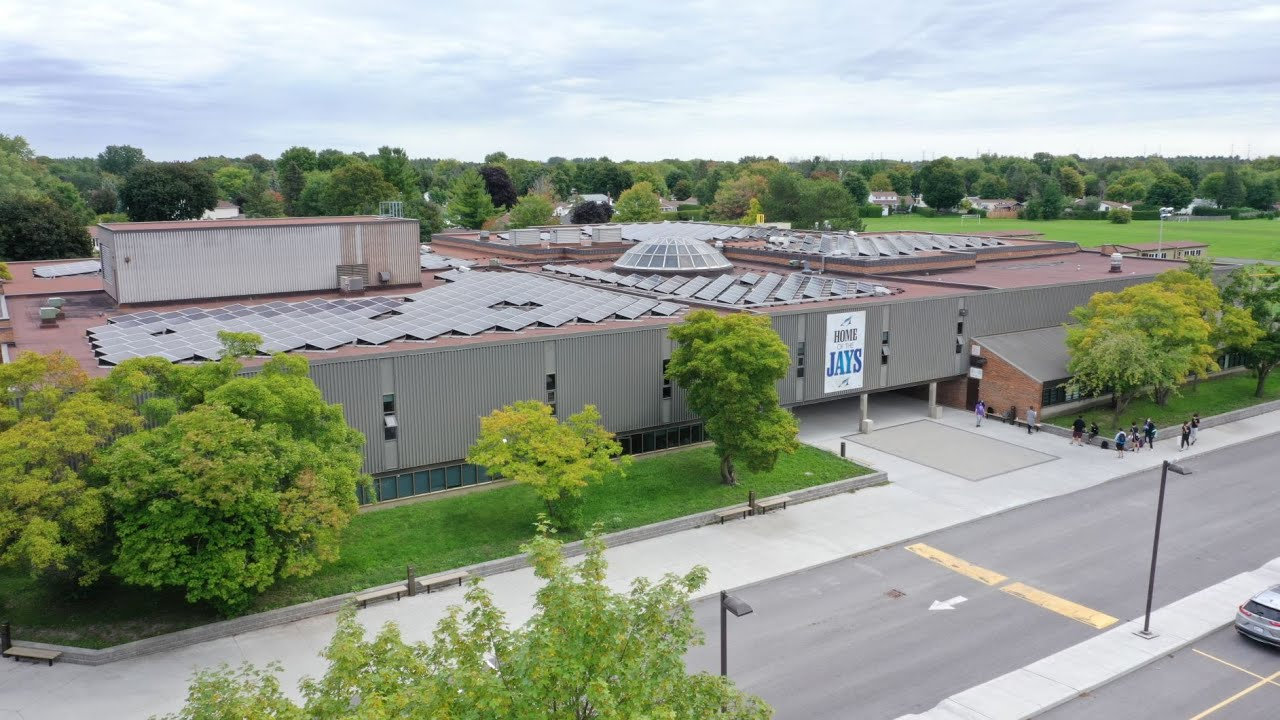
Aerial view of the main building and main entrance

A. Y. Jackson Secondary School is a community high school in the Glen Cairn neighbourhood of the Kanata suburb of Ottawa, Ontario, Canada. It is part of the Ottawa-Carleton District School Board and was first opened in 1976. The school was named after A. Y. Jackson, the famed Canadian painter and one of the founders of the Group of Seven. The majority of students are from W.O. Mitchell Elementary School, Glen Cairn Public School, and Katimavik Elementary School, its three feeder schools.

== Extracurricular activities ==
=== Drama ===
On the evening of Oct. 20, 2009, AYJ drama teacher Illona Henkelman and the cast of "A Few Good Men" were received awards at the Arts Advisory Committee Awards Ceremony. Mrs. Henkelman won the Secondary School Drama Teacher of the Year (2008–2009) award and the AYJ play "A Few Good Men" won an award for "Outstanding Event of the Year". In 2010, their production of "Sweeney Todd: The Demon Barber of Fleet Street" won in the Critic's Favourite Musical category at the annual Cappies Gala and, in 2011, they won the Critic's Favourite Play category with the Canada's Capital Cappies for their production of Neil Simon's "Plaza Suite".

The Drama and Music Department co-produced "The Addams Family Musical". This production was directed by drama teacher Ilona Henkleman with the music teacher Jessica Sullivan conducting the pit band. They won multiple awards at the Cappies in June, including the award for Best Musical.

=== Music ===
In February 2015, the AYJ Senior Band competed in the Capital Region Music Festival, a regional qualifying competition for MusicFest Canada. For the first time in the school's history, the band was awarded the Gold Standard for their performance.

=== Athletics ===
The school has achieved city National Capital Secondary School Athletic Association championships for the Varsity lacrosse (2015, 2016, 2018 & 2019) and junior boys rugby program. Senior Boys Volleyball won city championships in 1986, 1988, 1995, 2001, and 2002 as well as three Western Conference Championships in 2003, 2004, and 2020. The Junior Boys Basketball won three Western Conference titles (2003, 2005, 2006). The Blue Jays also won city championships for boys baseball in 2005, 2011, and 2014.

The AYJ Badminton Club won championships in 1983, 1985, 1986, 1997, 1998, 2005, and 2010. In 2008, the senior boys' basketball team won the provincial Boys' OFSAA AA championship, becoming the first Ottawa high school to win a provincial basketball championship in 59 years. In 2020, AYJ won a Tier 2 Girls Hockey Championship.

In 2009, the varsity boys non-contact hockey team won the city championship. The Snowboard & Ski Club is the largest club at the school with regular multi-day excursions during the winter months to Le Massif and Mont-Sainte-Anne, as well as single-day trips to Mont-Tremblant.

== Math and literacy standards ==
=== Grade 9 math ===
The percentage of A.Y Jackson Secondary School students that met the provincial grade 9 math standards in 2023–2024 was 59%, compared to 55% for the Ottawa-Carleton District School Board, and to 54% for Ontario's English schools and 61% for Ontario's French schools.

=== Grade 10 literacy ===
The percentage of A.Y Jackson Secondary School students that met the provincial grade 10 literacy standards in 2023–2024 was 94%, compared to 87% for the Ottawa-Carleton District School Board, and to 85% for Ontario's English schools and 92% for Ontario's French schools.

== Suicide of Jamie Hubley ==
On 15 October 2011, A. Y. Jackson student Jamie Hubley (son of Ottawa City Councillor Allan Hubley) died by suicide. According to a news report at the time, Hubley was the "only openly gay student at the school," and was bullied as a result. Hubley described in his final blog post being called "fag" in the hallways. His father stated that posters promoting the "anti-discrimination Rainbow Club" at school were torn down by students. Calls for stronger programs led to the establishment of an anti-bullying initiative, announced at A. Y. Jackson, and launched by the Canadian Red Cross in the wake of his suicide.

== Notable alumni ==
- Esther Akinsulie - sprinter
- Jim Bryson - musician

== See also ==
- Education in Ontario
- List of secondary schools in Ontario
