= Richmond Road (Ontario) =

Road in Ottawa, Canada

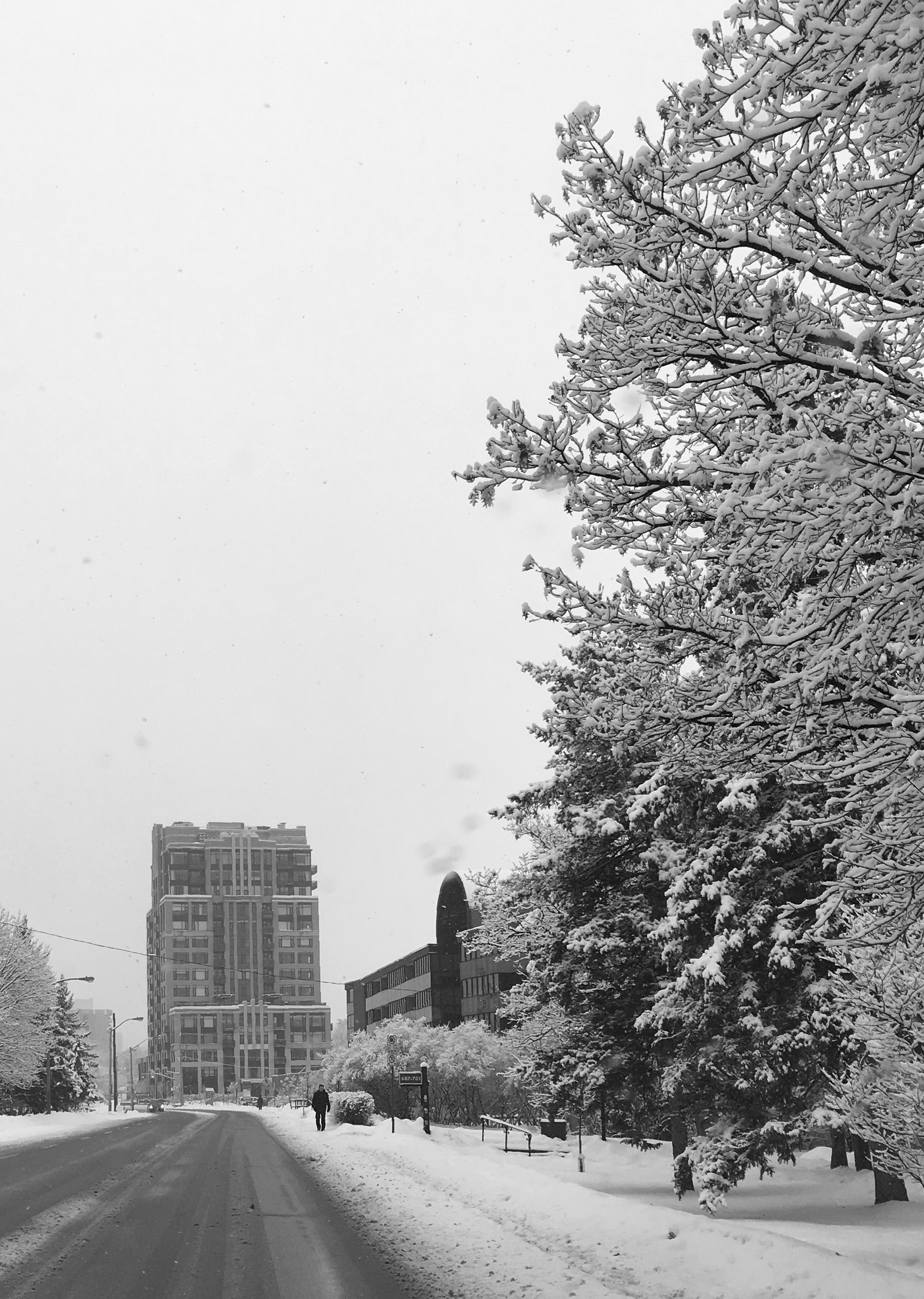
Richmond Road near Westboro

Richmond Road (Ottawa Road #36) is a major road in Eastern Ontario, Canada.

Richmond Road begins as a western continuation of Wellington Street West in Ottawa, beyond the intersection at Island Park Drive, a division point moved west a few blocks from Western Avenue, the historical township boundary, in 2005. It serves as the primary road for Westboro. Continuing westward, the road passes by Ottawa landmarks such as the Lincoln Fields Mall, Bayshore Shopping Centre and Queensway Carleton Hospital. At the intersection with Baseline Road (Ottawa Road 16), it gives way to Robertson Road just before reaching Bells Corners, due to a name change made in 2012. At the historical corner, the prior route of Richmond Road diverges to the south as a mostly residential street named Old Richmond Road. The "Old" name now attaches to the remainder of the former route, which regains its stature as a major road as the continuation of southbound Moodie Drive, leaving Bells Corners and running through the Greenbelt. Beyond the Greenbelt, Old Richmond Road passes the communities of Bridlewood and Fallowfield before intersecting with Ottawa Road 12 (Fallowfield Road). Continuing southward, the road passes the community of Twin Elm and follows the Jock River to Ottawa Road 49 (Eagleson Road) and the village of Richmond. Its total length from Island Park Drive to Eagleson Road is approximately 25.1 km (15.6 mi). At Eagleson, Old Richmond Road continues westward as Perth Street, or Ottawa Road #10. Beyond Perth, this road becomes Franktown Road, and then reverts to the name Richmond Road in Lanark County until its end in Franktown. In Lanark County, the road is known as Lanark County Road #10.

Richmond Road is known as Ottawa Road #36 from Island Park Drive to Robertson Road. Old Richmond Road is known as Ottawa Road #59 from Moodie Drive to Fallowfield Road. Speed limits range from 40 km/h (25 mph) in school and residential areas to 60 km/h (37 mph) in urban commercial areas, and 80 km/h (50 mph) in greenbelt and rural areas.

== History ==
Richmond Road was built in 1818 to connect the military settlement at Richmond with Richmond Landing just below the Chaudière Falls on the Ottawa River in Bytown. The British Government had offered land in the Richmond area to British veterans of the War of 1812. Richmond Road was originally a corduroy road. Today, what is left of the road is paved. It is one of the oldest roads in Ottawa.

In his 1896 book "The History of the Ottawa Valley", the Rev. John L. Gourlay wrote:

"We never heard why these distinguished colonists chose the banks of the Jock in preference to those of the Rideau or the Ottawa. They arrived in the middle of August at the Richmond landing, having left Quebec on the 28th of July, 1818, passing and saluting the fine man-of-war vessel at anchor, that had the Duke on board. Under Sergeant Hill, they organized to cut the road from the Flats, the place of their encampment to the Jock, ever since known as the Richmond Road. They kept within hailing distance of the river on their right hand until they reached the sandy hill, when the sight of the great bay directed them to the left, and at what was soon after, Bell's Corners; turned still more to the left till they struck the Jock, up which they kept their course till they reached the little falls, which Captain Lyons soon improved into a mill dam."

== Renaming controversy ==
On 13 April 2011, Ottawa City Council voted to rename a portion of Richmond Road from Baseline Road to Robertson Road (and Robertson Road itself) after the late Cyril Lloyd Francis, a land speculator, Liberal MP and Speaker of the House of Commons of Canada. The approved proposal would have changed the names of both roads through Bells Corners so that the commercial area would bear a single name, "Lloyd Francis Boulevard" for its entire length despite opposition from local residents and businesses. The name change was to have become effective in May 2012.

Because of the controversy, heritage advocates called on the city to overhaul its naming policy. However, on 13 July 2011 a new motion was passed rescinding the original change and renaming Richmond Road from Baseline Road to Robertson Road, Robertson Road instead. This accomplished the original goal of a single name through Bells Corners with a complete renumbering of the original Robertson Road, although at considerable inconvenience and expense to the residents and businesses located on it, and separating Richmond Road from Old Richmond Road by an unexplained lacuna of about 1.6 km.

== See also ==
- List of Ottawa, Ontario roads
- Wellington Street West
