= Hazeldean Road =

Road in Ottawa, Canada

Hazeldean Road (Ottawa Road #36) is a major road in Ottawa's west end. This road runs between the junction of Highway 7 west of Stittsville and Eagleson Road in Kanata, where it becomes Robertson Road east of the intersection and proceeds towards Bells Corners in the former city of Nepean, Ontario as a four-lane rural route through the Greenbelt.

It was once part of Highway 7 and Highway 15 before the western leg of Highway 417 was completed.

Most of the Kanata section of the road is commercial and includes Hazeldean Mall (although it actually faces Eagleson Road), a key shopping centre in the Kanata area. It is a four-lane road, with a 60 km/h (37 mph) speed limit between Terry Fox Drive and Eagleson Road, with this section servicing an average of 20,000 vehicles per day. West of Kanata towards Highway 7, it is mostly a two-lane rural route, although work was completed in Spring 2012 to widen the road to four lanes due to the increasing amount of traffic coming from Stittsville's growing community. The speed limit west of Terry Fox Drive was 70–80 km/h (43–50 mph) prior to road widening.

The widening of Hazeldean Road was completed in early 2012 between West Ridge Drive and Terry Fox Drive in Kanata and includes a unique suspension bridge over the Carp River. The speed limit in this section is 60 km/h (37 mph). Several strip malls and big-box stores have recently opened along Hazeldean Road, including Lowe's, Winners, Shoppers Drug Mart, and Food Basics. Restaurants such as Five Guys, Subway, Mr. Shawarma, and several others have also recently opened or are under construction in the area.

A new water main was installed between Terry Fox Drive and Castlefrank Road. The installation must be completed before construction can resume in the new subdivision of Kanata West, located near Huntmar Drive north of Hazeldean Road. A portion of the construction between Terry Fox Drive and Young Road was completed during the summer/fall of 2012, with the remainder completed in the fall of 2013.

== Communities ==
- Jackson Trails
- Fernbank
- West Ridge
- Kanata West (currently under construction)
- Katimavik
- Glen Cairn

== Major Intersections ==
- Ottawa Road 49 (Eagleson Road)
- Irwin Gate & Carbrooke Street
- Castlefrank Road
- Ottawa Road 61 (Terry Fox Drive)
- Grant Crossing Centre
- Huntmar Drive & Iber Road
- Fringewood Drive
- Johnwoods Street & Victor Street
- Springbrook Drive
- Ottawa Road 5A (Stittsville Main Street)
- Ottawa Road 5 (Carp Road)
- West Ridge Drive & Kittiwake Drive
- Rothbourne Road
- Highway 7
- David Manchester Road & Speedway Road
- Spruce Ridge Road
