= John Lowry Gourlay =

John Lowry Gourlay (1821–1905) was an Irish Presbyterian minister and missionary in Upper Canada.

== Life ==
John Lowry Gourlay was born in 1821 in Drumquin, County Tyrone, Ireland, the son of John Gourlay and Jane Lowry. He emigrated to Upper Canada with his parents, brothers Hugh, William, James, and sister Rebecca. They left Bytown, "walking out through the stumps of the Richmond Road, stopping for a mid-day meal at William Bell's tavern, spending the night at Billy Bradley's log tavern at Hazeldean, and proceeding to Stittsville the next day and then up the third line of Huntley".

The Gourlays settled in the Huntley and March townships. John was ordained as a Presbyterian minister and served as the first Presbyterian minister in Ashton.

In 1851 he became the first settled minister of the Merivale Presbyterian Church and served the congregation there until 1868. It was written of him "Rev. Gourlay appears to have been both erudite and energetic. He is described as a diligent student of theology and a Hebrew and Greek scholar of note". In addition to Merivale (then known as Hopper's Settlement), he later served congregations in Bell's Corners, Goulbourn, and Aylmer, QC. In the early 1850s he was also a Superintendent of Schools in March Township. While in Aylmer, he served as chaplain of the Masonic Lodge.

In Bell's Corners, Gourlay acquired Lot 10, Concession 2, Ottawa Front. On 18 January 1862, he sold six acres in the west part of the lot to the Municipality of Nepean. On the same day, the municipality then sold the original road allowance between Lots 10 and 11, totalling 11 acres, to Gourlay. Seven years later he sold all his land to Robert Moodie on 24 March 1869. Moodie then sold part of an acre to Canada C.R. Co. on 14 June 1870 and the remaining lands to his son Robert, less parts of the original road allowance between Lots 10 and 11 on 10 July 1905.

John Lowry Gourlay died in 1904.

== Writings ==
In 1896 Gourlay wrote the History of the Ottawa Valley: A Collection of Facts, Events and Reminiscences for Over Half a Century. The book includes a second work entitled Difficulties of Religion. A quote from Gourlay's history reads as follows:

To indolence and carelessness may be attributed the meagre information we possess regarding the origin, progress, growth and decay of so many branches of the human race. Even the briefest correct records would be of signal advantage to posterity and to the historian. The migratory disposition of mankind makes it difficult to preserve such records even when they exist. Intelligent young people should keep short notes of stirring events that come within the range of their observation as these must be of interest and in the hands of one who could classify and arrange and generalize they would not be heavy, but readable.
