= Westcliffe Estates =

- Neighbourhood
- Location within Ottawa
- Coordinates: 45°19′04″N 75°50′08″W
- Country: Canada
- Province: Ontario
- Municipality: Ottawa
- Founded: 1969

Government
  - Mayor: Jim Watson
  - MP: Chandra Arya
  - MPP: Lisa MacLeod
  - City Councillor: Rick Chiarelli

Area
  - Total: 1.369 km^{2} (0.529 sq mi)
- Elevation: 93 m (305 ft)

Population (2016)
  - Total: 4,346
  - Density: 3,175/km^{2} (8,222/sq mi)
- Time zone: UTC-5 (EST)
  - Summer (DST): UTC-4 (EDT)
- Postal Code: K2H
- Area Codes: 613, 343

Westcliffe Estates (Bells Corners West), is a neighbourhood of Bells Corners in College Ward, in the west end of Ottawa, Ontario, Canada. Founded in 1969, most of the older homes in this area were built by Assaly Construction and later the Thomas C. Assaly Corporation. The Westcliffe community is characterized by significantly higher residential densities than other parts of Bells Corners. There is a multi-storey housing complex operated by Nepean Housing as well as a multi-storey seniors residence and co-operative housing project. Today there are a total of 1760 homes in the neighbourhood.

== Westcliffe Estates: the New Community ==
The 1879 map of Bell's Corners, shows the lands that are now called Westcliffe as farmland and forest, owned by John Robertson, J.R. O'Grady, Owen Hammill, James Sparks and John Sparks. A 1952 map, has the Robertson land owned by Thomas Robertson, O'Grady's by William Morrison, Hammill's land by William Hammill and the Spark's land owned by Ernest Byrne.

The 1962 zoning by-law shows plans, of what would eventually be known as Westcliffe Estates, for single-family homes (R3) on urban lots (60 x 100). North of what would be Oberon, Mill Hill, Terrace and Waterfall were zoned for light industry (M). By 1969, the layout for the northern section was rezoned: what would be Priam and Ariel, one side of Cymbeline and Oberon, and two small parcels on Tarquin, were designated single or double homes on smaller lots (R4); the remaining parts of Oberon and Cymbeline, Tybalt and Tarquin, garden homes and townhouses (R5). Roadways were outlined for Westcliffe and the northern leg of Seyton. A parcel of land to the east of Oberon was still zoned R3, as was the rest of the area. The park areas had not been designated at this time.

== The New Development ==
Westcliffe Estates was first developed by Assaly and Johannsen, with parcels of land later sold to other developers. Building had started in 1969/70 with families moving into their new homes on Oberon, Cymbeline, and Ariel in 1970. Many of these semi-detached homes were celebrated, and marketed, as fine examples of mid-century modern residential design.

1970 also saw the start of a new official plan for Nepean, which changed the face of the proposed Westcliffe Estates. The new plan also outlined proposals for industrial/commercial development on lands north of the Bell's Corners strip.

The new plan was designed on the 'neighbourhood unit' concept, based on the distance young children could be expected to walk to school, and with a centrally located park. Internal roads were designed to discourage through traffic, no longer on the formal grid system, and only wide enough for the required traffic volume. Winding crescents would feed onto collector roads, which would then connect to the main arterial roads.

The 'neighbourhood unit' also designated apartment buildings and townhouses in the centre of the new community, along with single-family dwellings. Mixed zoning was a new concept, and Westcliffe's new plan was a good blend of housing types. The mix also included resident homeowners and rental units.

Building rapidly continued until 1976, with the completion of homes on Tarquin, Tybalt, Priam, and Westcliffe. By this time most of the building was being done by the Thomas C. Assaly Corp. There were four basic designs on Priam named the Chelsea, the Regency, the Rockcliffe, and the Tudor. While on Westcliffe Road the semi-detached homes were named Ambassador, Monarch, and Diplomat. In the following years more building gradually started with the townhouses on Forester and Sonnet (1978/79), Seyton and Lovell (1982) single-family homes on Tyrrell (1983), Eileen Tallman (1985), Harmer House (1986) and single-family homes on the west ridge of the community, Seyton, Florizel, Robina, Fagus (Stonepark) and Betula (Forestview) (1989).

== The Changing Face of the Community ==
The 1971 plan officially designated parkland, including the small parks at Priam, Florizel, and Betula (Forestview). Lovell, the school, Betula and Florizel were still R3. The land east of Oberon was rezoned M for light industry. Tyrrell was zoned R4, Forester, Sonnet, Seyton and Hammill were zoned R5, for multi-family housing. However, with the expansion of industrial and commercial development, and the ever-increasing demand for housing, developers kept coming back requesting changes to the 1971 plan.

By 1980, changes were made from R3 to I (institutional) for the Catholic school, (St. Paul, now Franco Ouest), constructed in 1978. Lovell had been rezoned from R3 to R5, to allow for the town home clusters. What would be Hammill, the school parking lot, Eileen Tallman, Harmer House and the corner of Tyrrell and Seyton were all rezoned R6 for apartments.

In the late 80s, the land east of Oberon nearly became residential. Terrace, Mill Hill, and Waterfall were changed to residential, R4, R5, and R1C to allow a mixed development, and Institutional for Robertson House. Harmer House also went from R5 to Institutional. The land on Robertson was now mixed light industrial (M) and commercial (C). Florizel, Robina, Betula, Fagus, and the western part of Seyton had already been zoned for mixed housing, ranging from R3 to R5. In 1989, the R3 designation was removed to allow for larger singles on smaller lots and less townhouses. Betula and Fagus were renamed Forestview and Stonepark.

By 1992, the school parking lot finally lost its apartment designation and became institutional (I). Hammill Court, built by Nepean Housing in 1992, was again rezoned to allow for special mixed dwellings (R1C). Further development took place in the north of the community on Terrace, Mill Hill and Waterfall (1986), and in 1990, Westcliffe finally got a community centre.

== The New Millennium ==
In 2000, the City of Nepean consolidated its urban zoning by-law. Although zoning numbers have changed on Hammill, Terrace, and Waterfall (now R7) the designation remains the same. The Tyrrell / Seyton land (R6) was still vacant and the only land in the community that could bring change in the new millennium.

== Westcliffe Estates Names ==
Most of the names in Westcliffe may seem quite unusual, but obviously, someone was interested in Shakespeare:

Name	Origin
Ariel	The Tempest (Spirit)
Cymbeline	Cymbeline (King of Britain)
Florizel	The Winter's Tale (Prince of Bohemia)
Forester	As You Like It (woodsman)
Lovell	Richard III (Sir Francis) Henry VIII (Sir Thomas)
Oberon	A Midsummer Night's Dream (Fairy King)
Priam	Troilus and Cressida (King of Troy)
Seyton	Macbeth (Macbeth's officer)
Sonnet	14-line poem (Shakespeare wrote 154 sonnets, about the same as the number of houses on Sonnet)
Tarquin	The Rape of Lucrece (Etruscan King) (Also mentioned in Julius Caesar, Coriolanus, Macbeth, Titus Andronicus and Cymbeline)
Tybalt	Romeo and Juliet (Juliet's cousin)
Tyrrell	Richard III (Sir James)

Then there are street names with a nature connection:

Name	Origin
Betula	(old name for Forestview) birch tree
Fagus	(old name for Stonepark) beech tree
Forestview	self-explanatory
Robina	locust tree

Which leaves:

Name	Origin
Eileen Tallman	a labour union organizer who pioneered unions at Eaton's
Hammill	a pioneer farmer of Westcliffe land
Harmer House	Frederick Harmer, a long-serving Town Clerk, 1866–1905
Moodie	a pioneer farmer
Robertson	a pioneer farmer of Westcliffe land
Stonepark	it used to be 'park' land and a lot of stones were in this area
Westcliffe	the western cliff in Nepean

== Zoning definitions and their uses ==
Zoning	Usage
Zoning By-law 39-62
R3	lot 6500 sq. ft., maximum height 35 ft. – detached one-family dwelling, park, day nursery, church
R4	lot 7000 sq. ft., maximum height 35 ft. – same as R3, plus semi-detached, duplex, boarding house, religious institution, library, private club, hospital, home for the aged
R5	lot 10000 sq. ft., maximum height 110 ft. – same as R4 plus double duplex, apartment
Zoning By-law 39-81
R3	types of buildings slightly modified
R4	lots 5000 – 7000 sq. ft., one semi-detached or one detached or two detached, park
R5	lot 1776 sq. ft., changed for each unit – semi-detached, multiple attached, apartment removed
R5B	lots 1 acre, maximum height 35 ft. – multiple attached (15.37 units per acre), apartment removed
R6B	lots 2 acres, maximum height 110 ft. – apartment (45.32 units per acre)
I	maximum height 80.5 ft. – cemetery, church, school, nursery, seniors', hospital, nursing home, funeral parlour, municipal office, police/fire station
R1C	mixed lot sizes, maximum height 82 ft. – attached, semi-detached, multiple attached, apartment
Zoning By-law 100-2000
R4	one semi-detached or one detached or two detached, smaller lots added, park removed
R5	as R4, semi-detached, multiple attached
R5B	as before
R6B	as before
R7	multiple attached, apartment – Hammill Court has modifier on height (82 ft.) and density (from 45.32 to 27.35 per acre)
I	nursery, school removed
IS	maximum height 35.10 ft. – nursery, school – place of assembly, place of worship as secondary uses only
