= Kanata South Ward =

Kanata South
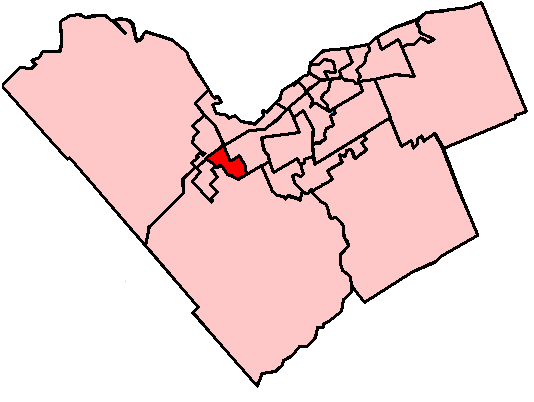
- Location within Ottawa
- Coordinates: 45°18′N 75°52′W
- Country: Canada
- Province: Ontario
- City: Ottawa

Government
  - Councillor: Erin Coffin

Area
  - Total: 16.5 km^{2} (6.4 sq mi)

Population (2016)Canada 2016 Census
  - Total: 47,435
  - Density: 2,870/km^{2} (7,450/sq mi)

Languages (2016)
  - English: 72.8%
  - French: 7.8%
  - Mandarin: 2.4%
  - Arabic: 2.0%
  - Spanish: 1.5%
  - Cantonese: 1.3%
  - Russian: 1.2%
- Avg. income: $45,413

Kanata South Ward or Ward 23 (French: Quartier Kanata-Sud) is a municipal ward in Ottawa, Ontario. Located in the city's west end, the ward created in 2006 includes the communities of Katimavik-Hazeldean, Glen Cairn, Bridlewood, and Trailwest. During a ward re-organization in 2006, the former Kanata Ward was split into two wards, Kanata North for areas north of Highway 417 and Kanata South for areas to the south.

== City councillors ==
1. Peggy Feltmate (2006–2010)
2. Allan Hubley (2010–2026)
3. Erin Coffin (2026–present)

== Election results ==
=== 2006 Ottawa municipal election ===
Candidate	Votes	%
Peggy Feltmate	8344	50.05
Allan Hubley	5631	33.78
Amrik Dhami	1314	7.88
Richard Rutkowski	811	4.86
Suraj Harish	571	3.43

=== 2010 Ottawa municipal election ===
Candidate	Votes	%
Allan Hubley	6783	48.80
Aaron Helleman	5054	36.36
Marc Favreau	1633	11.75
Roodney Tellez	196	1.41
Perry Simpson	126	0.91
Michel Tardif	109	0.78

=== 2014 Ottawa municipal election ===
Candidate	Vote	%
Allan Hubley	9,710	84.69
Bruce Anthony Faulkner	1,362	11.88
David Abuwa	394	3.44

=== 2018 Ottawa municipal election ===
Candidate	Vote	%
Allan Hubley	6,183	45.53
Steve Anderson	4,274	31.47
Mike Brown	2,978	21.93
Doug Large	146	1.08

=== 2022 Ottawa municipal election ===
Candidate	Vote	%
Allan Hubley	5,334	33.86
Erin Coffin	3,611	22.92
Rouba Fattal	3,606	22.89
Mike Dawson	1,782	11.31
Bina Shah	1,422	9.03

=== 2026 Ottawa municpal election ===
Candidate	Vote	%
Erin Coffin	7,878	49.69
Allan Hubley	5,248	33.10
Sam Bhalesar	1,547	9.76
Megan Strazds-Esenbergs	1,182	7.46
