= Glen Cairn =

Coordinates: 45°17′37″N 75°52′55″W

Glen Cairn is a neighbourhood in Kanata South Ward in the west end of Ottawa, Ontario, Canada. It is also the name of a public school in the area. Prior to amalgamation in 2001, it was located in the City of Kanata; now, it is located in South Kanata, about 22 km (14 mi) west of Downtown Ottawa. One of the original neighbourhoods in Kanata, the community was built in the 1960s, and was part of Goulbourn Township until the creation of Kanata in 1978. As of the Canada 2016 Census, there were 11,836 people living in Glen Cairn.

== Location ==
Glen Cairn is located north of the Trans-Canada Trail, south of Hazeldean Road, west of Eagleson Road, and east of Terry Fox Drive.

Castlefrank Road is the principal arterial road travelling through the community. Other main roads include Abbeyhill Drive, Winchester Drive, and Rothesay Drive.

== Notable Institutions ==
Glen Cairn is home to one of Kanata's oldest high schools, A. Y. Jackson Secondary School, the only public high school in Kanata South. Kanata is also home to Glen Cairn Public (elementary) School, the middle school of Glen Cairn. Elementary Schools in Glen Cairn include John Young Public School and St. Martin de Porres Catholic School. An outdoor swimming pool, Jack Charron Arena, Glen Cairn Tennis Courts, the Hazeldean Mall, and the Ottawa Public Library's Hazeldean branch are also located in the neighbourhood. The community churches include Holy Redeemer Catholic, Glen Cairn United, and the Kanata Community Christian Reform. The Jack Charron Arena also houses the Kanata Sports Club; the Kanata Hazeldean Lions Club building is located on Castlefrank Road.

== OC Transpo ==
OC Transpo provides transit services in the community. Express route 61 provides peak period service downtown. Route 161 and route 164 provide direct access to Kanata Centrum at Terry Fox Station (route 161 during the day on weekdays; route 164 during evenings and on weekends). Route 61 and route 68 are available on nearby Hazeldean Road.

== Notable residents ==
- Allan Hubley – councillor of Kanata South
- Michael A. Chambers – former president of the Canadian Olympic Committee
