= Eagleson Road =

Road in Ottawa, Canada

Eagleson Road (Ottawa Road #49) is a northwest–southeast road in Ottawa's west end in Kanata. It starts at Highway 417 and ends at Brophy Drive south of Richmond. North of Highway 417 it becomes March Road. It is a key link, primarily for residents of Bridlewood, between both ends of Kanata where housing developments are growing steadily in the north and the south. The primary segment of Eagleson Road is divided and six lanes wide (three per direction) between Highway 417 and Abbeyhill Drive, while between Abbeyhill Drive and just south of Stonehaven Drive it is a four-lane divided arterial. South of that, Eagleson is a two-lane undivided rural road.

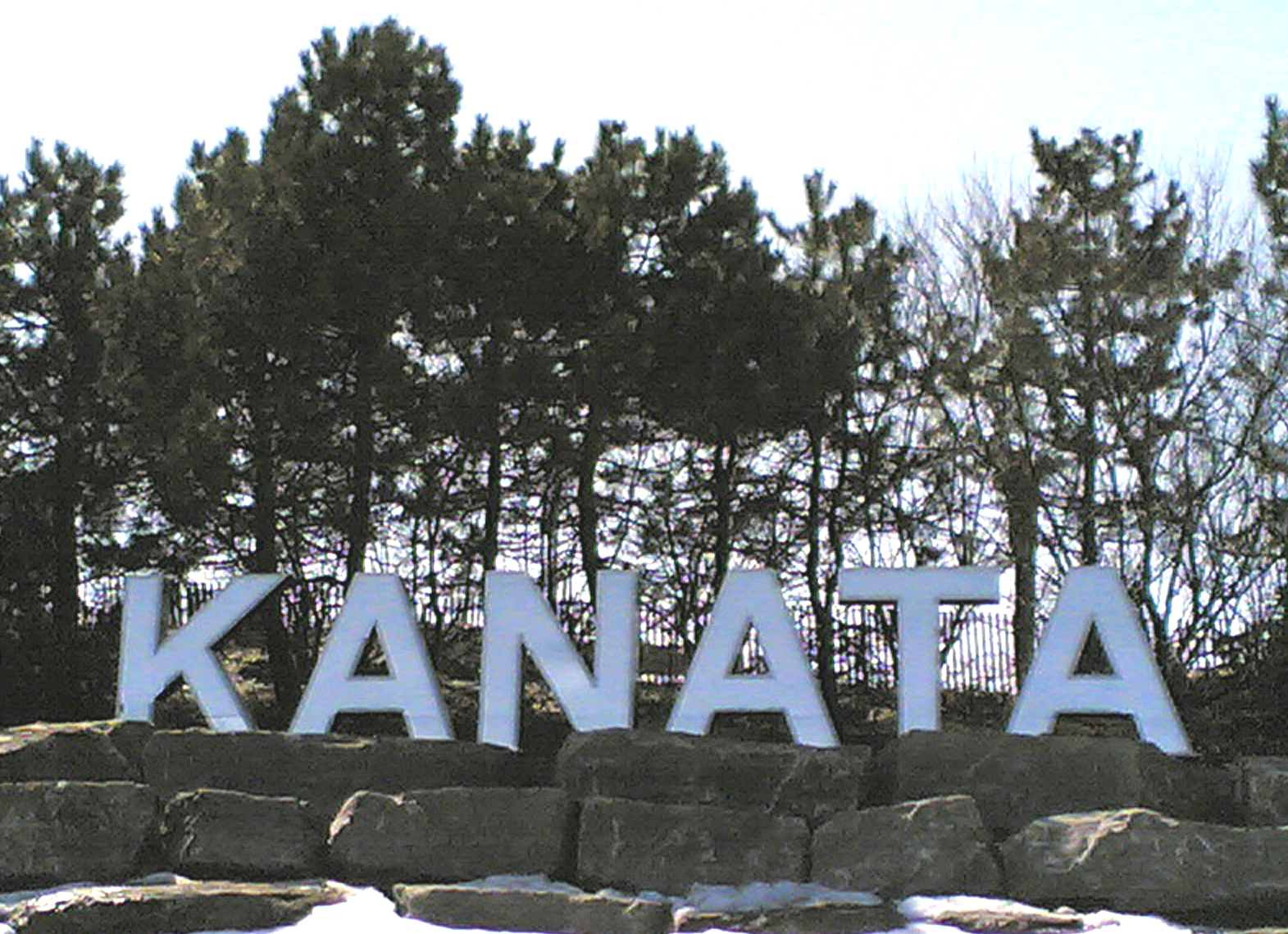

The alignment of Teron Road south of Campeau Drive was formerly Eagleson (Side) Road, prior to Highway 417 being extended to the west.

Key locations on this road include Eagleson Station from the OC Transpo's transitway system. Just south of the intersection with Hazeldean Road is the Hazeldean Mall, an important mall for the community.

== Major intersections ==
March Road continues north of Highway 417.

- Highway 417
- Katimavik Road & Timm Drive
- Kakulu Road
- Hazeldean Road & Robertson Road
- Hazeldean Mall (300 Eagleson Road)
- Abbeyhill Drive
- Palomino Drive
- Rothesay Drive & Palomino Drive
- Stonehaven Drive & Michael Cowpland Drive
- Real Canadian Superstore (760 Eagleson Road)
- Cope Drive & Cadence Gate
- Fernbank Road
- Bridgestone Drive
- Emerald Meadows Drive & Romina Street
- Terry Fox Drive & Hope Side Road
- Fallowfield Road
- Old Richmond Road & Perth Street
- Barnsdale Road
- Via Rail crossing
- Ottawa Street
- Brophy Drive

Eagleson Road continues south as McCordick Road.

== Communities ==
- Kanata Town Centre
- Katimavik-Hazeldean
- Glen Cairn
- Bridlewood
- Richmond
