= Lynwood Village =

Neighbourhood in Ottawa, Ontario, Canada

Coordinates: 45.319°N 75.822°W

Lynwood Village is a neighbourhood in Bells Corners, west of Ottawa, Ontario, Canada. The neighbourhood is also known as Bells Corners East. The homes were built in between 1958 and 1966. It is one of the first examples of tract housing in Ottawa. The neighbourhood is bounded to the north Robertson Road, east is presumably Highway 416, south by Hunt Club Road, and the west is Moodie Drive.

== History and development ==
The first area to be developed was Stinson Avenue in 1950, followed by Arbeatha Park in 1955–1958, and then Lynwood Village. Land speculators Lloyd Francis and Donald Sim had assembled a vast tract of land. In 1958, they brought in Bill Teron to build the entire subdivision. By 1960, four hundred families lived in Teron's bungalows; another four hundred homes were built in 1961. Many more were built between 1962 and 1965. The last area of Lynwood to be developed was the area bounded by Richmond, Robertson, and Moodie Drive in the late 1960s and 1970s. Today, there are over 1700 homes in the Lynwood area. Later, in the 1980s senior's homes were built.

Lynwood Village is considered to be the biggest neighbourhood in Bells Corners.

== Amenities ==
The neighbourhood is home to four schools Bell High School, Bell Corners Public School, Our Lady of Peace Catholic School and Collège catholique Franco-Ouest; there are many parks such as Trevor Park, Bell Field, George Wilson Park, Williams Park and Lynwood Park; Centennial Library built in 1967 as one of Expo 67 style dome and CCBC (Christ Church Bells Corners) Originally built in 1853. Entrance Park features a public outdoor pool named Entrance Pool. It is run and staffed by the City of Ottawa. It is open from around mid June to around the third week in August. It features a wading pool, a 25-yard pool and a dive tank with diving boards. Lynwood Park features a community centre, tennis courts and soccer fields. Many strip malls are on Robertson Road.
