= Katimavik-Hazeldean =

Coordinates: 45°18′20″N 75°53′30″W

Katimavik-Hazeldean is a neighbourhood in Kanata South Ward in the west end of Ottawa, Ontario, Canada. It is located in the former City of Kanata which amalgamated into Ottawa in 2001. It is located in south-central Kanata, bounded by Eagleson Road to the east, Hazeldean Road to the south, the Carp River to the west, and Highway 417 to the north.

According to the 2011 Canadian census, the total population of the neighborhood was 12,088.

== History ==
By 1866, Hazeldean was a small post village with a population of about 50, in the township of Goulbourn. The village contained one general store; one common school, with an average attendance of twenty-four pupils; and one church, used in common by the Church of England, Presbyterians, and Wesleyan Methodists.

Campeau Corporation started development of the Chimo Drive neighbourhood between Katimavik and Kakulu roads in the early-mid 1970s, based on the garden-city style implemented by Bill Teron in Beaverbrook on the opposite side of the highway. Numerous developers followed Campeau's lead, progressively developing the area west of Castlefrank Road and the area between Kakulu and Hazeldean roads (annexed to Kanata from Goulbourn Township) in a sympathetic style in the 1980s and early 1990s.

The area between Katimavik Road and the highway was intended to be part of the Kanata Town Centre and originally zoned for light commercial/industrial and later high-density residential. Much of that area was rezoned for medium-density residential, and several townhouses and detached single developments were built on that land in the 1990s.

As in other parts of Kanata, most streets are named according to neighbourhood themes: In the northeast section, Arctic explorers; in the southeast section, Canadian broadcasters and entertainers; in the west section, Canadian inventors; and in the former Town Centre lands north of Katimavik Road, Ontario premiers and lieutenant governors. The community was named "Katimavik", in 1972 by 12 year old Kanata resident Corinne Friesen was the result of a local area contest. "Katimavik" means "Gathering Place".

Beginning in the late 1980s, the area between Terry Fox Drive and the Carp River has slowly filled with small office buildings, research and development facilities, and big-box stores, with some parcels still awaiting development. The southern half of those lands has been developed as a large multi-use sports facility (Walter Baker Park), including the Kanata Recreation Centre and Ron Maslin Playhouse.

There is also a small light-industrial area in the extreme southwest corner, home to a number of automotive businesses along Edgewater Street and restaurants facing Walter Baker Park across Terry Fox Drive.

== Architectural style ==
The Chimo Drive area, in particular, has preserved its original architectural style, remarkable for its wide lots heavily treed with evergreens and birch, pedestrian-friendly globe-style lawn lamps, and no sidewalks. There is a variety of house models of similar style, set well back from the streets, and their earth-toned exteriors and low-pitch roofs contribute to the natural, almost cottage-country feel of this community.

The more recently developed areas between Kakulu Road and Hazeldean Road, and between Castlefrank Road and Terry Fox Drive, are more modern and somewhat higher-density, but also have the lawn lamps and networks of connecting pathways characteristic of neighbourhoods established during the period when a municipal committee existed to uphold Kanata neighbourhood-design standards.

=== Streetlighting ===
Through the community associations and the Councillor's offices, residents of Kanata have been working hard over the years to maintain a "dark skies" policy to prevent light pollution. Any new lighting fixtures have to meet certain standards for illumination.

Most of the streetlighting in the area is provided by low-level lawn lights and a few remaining illuminated street-name boxes. Unlike most other areas in Kanata, the underground wiring system in the Chimo Drive area is maintained by the city. As the circuits are nearly 40 years old and are reaching the end of their service life, local residents and the community association will be given a choice in the style of lights from a number of options in the city's new right-of-way lighting policy. This first happened in 2003 on Amundsen Crescent.

The experience of replacing the eye-friendly lawn lights with standard high-mast high-pressure sodium (HPS) streetlights on Amundsen Crescent did not significantly improve illumination levels (many shadows and poor colour rendering), making it less pedestrian-friendly. Although the tall HPS street lights meet dark-sky requirements, their position and intensity make it difficult for pedestrians to see the stars.

== Services and amenities ==
- Four elementary schools: Katimavik Elementary School (English public, French-immersion), Castlefrank Elementary School (English public), Holy Redeemer (English Catholic), and Roger-Saint-Denis (French Catholic). Both Katimavik and Roger-Saint-Denis ranked among the top ten schools in Ontario in 2009.
- One high school: Holy Trinity Catholic High School
- Highway access: three exits offer access to/from Highway 417: 138 (Eagleson Road), 139 (Castlefrank Road/Kanata Avenue, a half-interchange), and 140 (Terry Fox Drive).
- Public transit (OC Transpo): Main service is Connexion Route 257, connecting to downtown along Castlefrank Road and Katimavik Road in peak-times only, and Eagleson Station. Hazeldean Road and Terry Fox Drive to Katimavik are served by route 88 and Eagleson Road is served by route 164. Express service all-day is provided by routes 61 and 62. Additional local service is provided on a limited basis by routes 161 and 168.
- Parks and recreation: Several large open and wooded areas (including Katimavik Woods, Watts Creek, Cattail Creek, Larsen, Pickford, Irwin Gate, Hewitt, The Escarpment, Hazeldean Woods, Haywood, Sewell, Rowe, Dorey, Stonegate Park, Gesner, Dunlop and Young's Pond Park), connected by a network of footpaths. Kanata Leisure Complex (with wave pool). Kanata Recreation Complex (arenas), Walter Baker Park toboggan hill, Ron Maslin Playhouse. Outdoor public pool and wading pool at Katimavik Elementary School. Outdoor rinks at Young's Pond Park and behind Katimavik School are maintained by local users and the Katimavik Hazeldean Community Association.
- Shopping: Kanata Town Centre with shopping and restaurant strips along Hazeldean Road and Terry Fox Drive serve within the community. Along the borders of Katimavik Hazeldean are Kanata Centrum and Hazeldean Mall and strips on the South side of Hazeldean Road Small neighbourhood malls are located on Kakulu Road near Eagleson Road and on Katimavik Road near Terry Fox Drive.
- Health care: A medical centre (walk-in clinic, multiple specialists, medical laboratory, and pharmacy) is centrally located at Kakulu and Castlefrank roads, and there is a walk-in clinic at Kanata Town Centre. Nearby hospitals: Queensway-Carleton and Carleton Place.

== Political Representation ==
- Federally, Katimavik-Hazeldean is a part of the Kanata—Carleton Federal Riding, represented by Jenna Sudds since the 2021 Federal Election
- Provincially, Katimavik-Hazeldean is a part of the Kanata—Carleton Provincial Riding, represented by Karen McCrimmon since a 2023 by-election
- Municipally, Katimavik-Hazeldean is a part of the Kanata South Ward, represented by Allan Hubley since the 2010 Municipal Election

== Notable residents ==
- Chris Neil – hockey player (former resident)
