= Allan Hubley =

Canadian politician

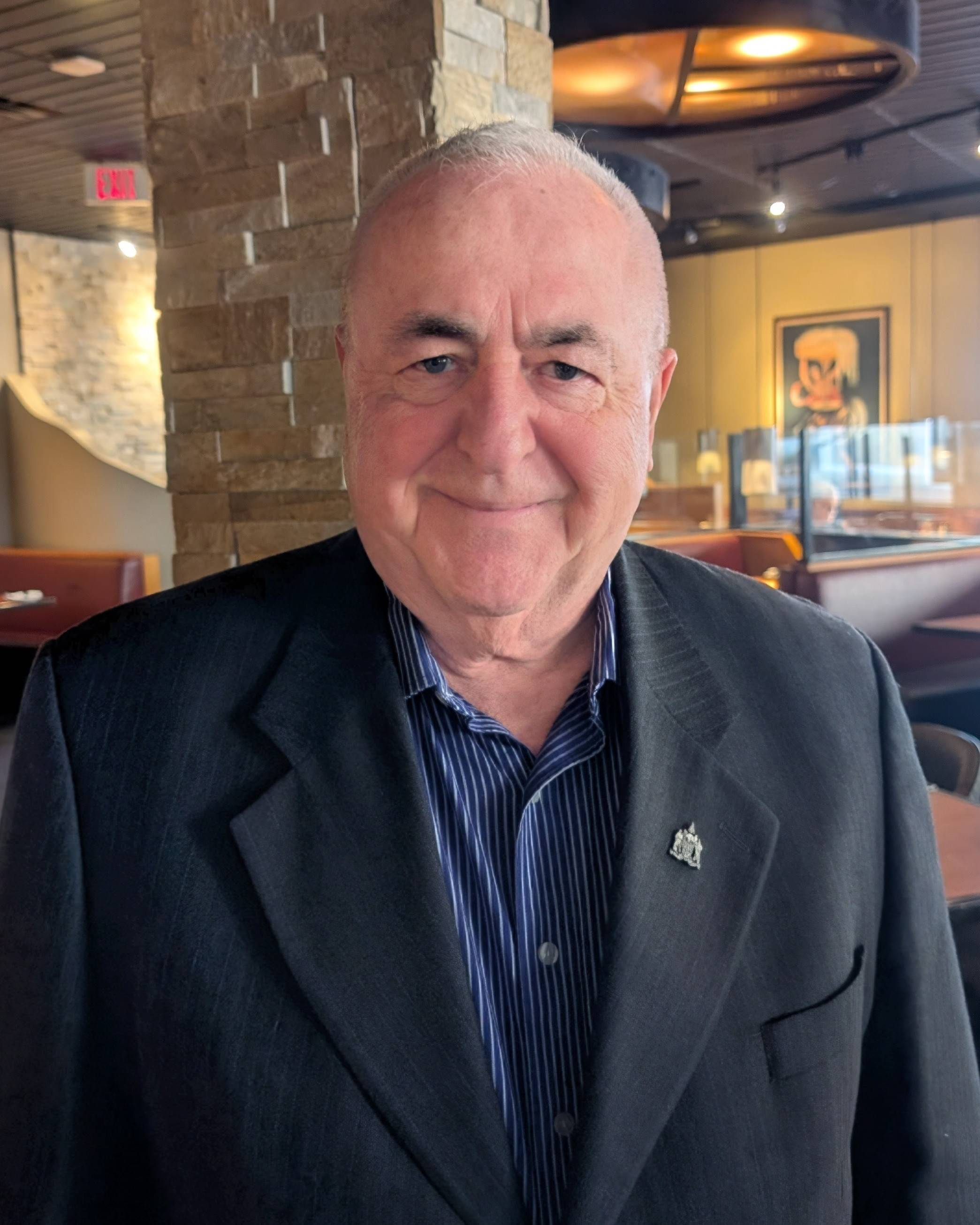
- Hubley in 2025.

Ottawa City Councillor
- In office December 1, 2010 – November 15, 2026
- Preceded by: Peggy Feltmate
- Succeeded by: Erin Coffin
- Constituency: Kanata South Ward

Personal details
- Born: 1958 (age 67–68) Annapolis Royal, Nova Scotia, Canada
- Spouse: Wendy Barber

Allan Hubley (born 1958) is a municipal politician in Ottawa, Ontario, who has served as an Ottawa City Councillor for Kanata South Ward since 2010.

== Background ==
Born and raised in Annapolis Royal, Nova Scotia, Hubley first moved to Kanata in 1978 and has been active in his community for many years. During a ceremony at City Hall in 2007, Hubley was recognized for his extensive community service in Kanata South and across the city and was named the Citizen of the Year for the City of Ottawa.

In 2008, Hubley was chosen by the Governor General of Canada to receive the Caring Canadian Award at Rideau Hall for his community and volunteer work.

Hubley is a supporter of the Conservative Party of Canada.

== Family ==
Hubley is married to Wendy Barber. The couple have had three children.

On October 14, 2011, Hubley's 15-year-old son Jamie died by suicide, likely as a result of his depression and being subjected to anti-gay bullying at his high school. An "It Gets Better" video dedicated to Hubley was posted by a contingent of Conservative Party of Canada MPs, and comedian Rick Mercer made a statement about it on his CBC television program Rick Mercer Report. Drake Jensen, a gay Canadian country singer, also dedicated his 2012 single "On My Way to Finding You" to Hubley's memory.

Jamie Hubley's death was the impetus for the Accepting Schools Act, 2012, an act of the Legislative Assembly of Ontario which mandated school boards across the province to develop tougher anti-bullying programs with tougher penalties for infractions, and offered legal protections for gay-straight alliances in the province's schools.

On June 3, 2013, Allan Hubley and Laureen Harper announced a new federal anti-bullying strategy, which will see approximately 2,400 teenagers across Canada trained in delivering peer education workshops and presentations against bullying for their fellow students.

Preceded by Peggy Feltmate	City councillors from Kanata South Ward; 2010-present	Succeeded by Incumbent
