= Amazon Lab126 =

American research and development and computer hardware company

Amazon Lab126, Inc.
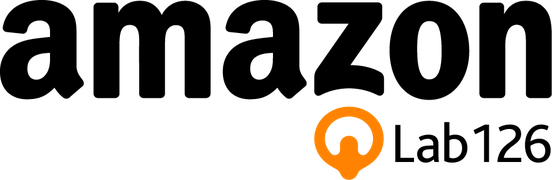

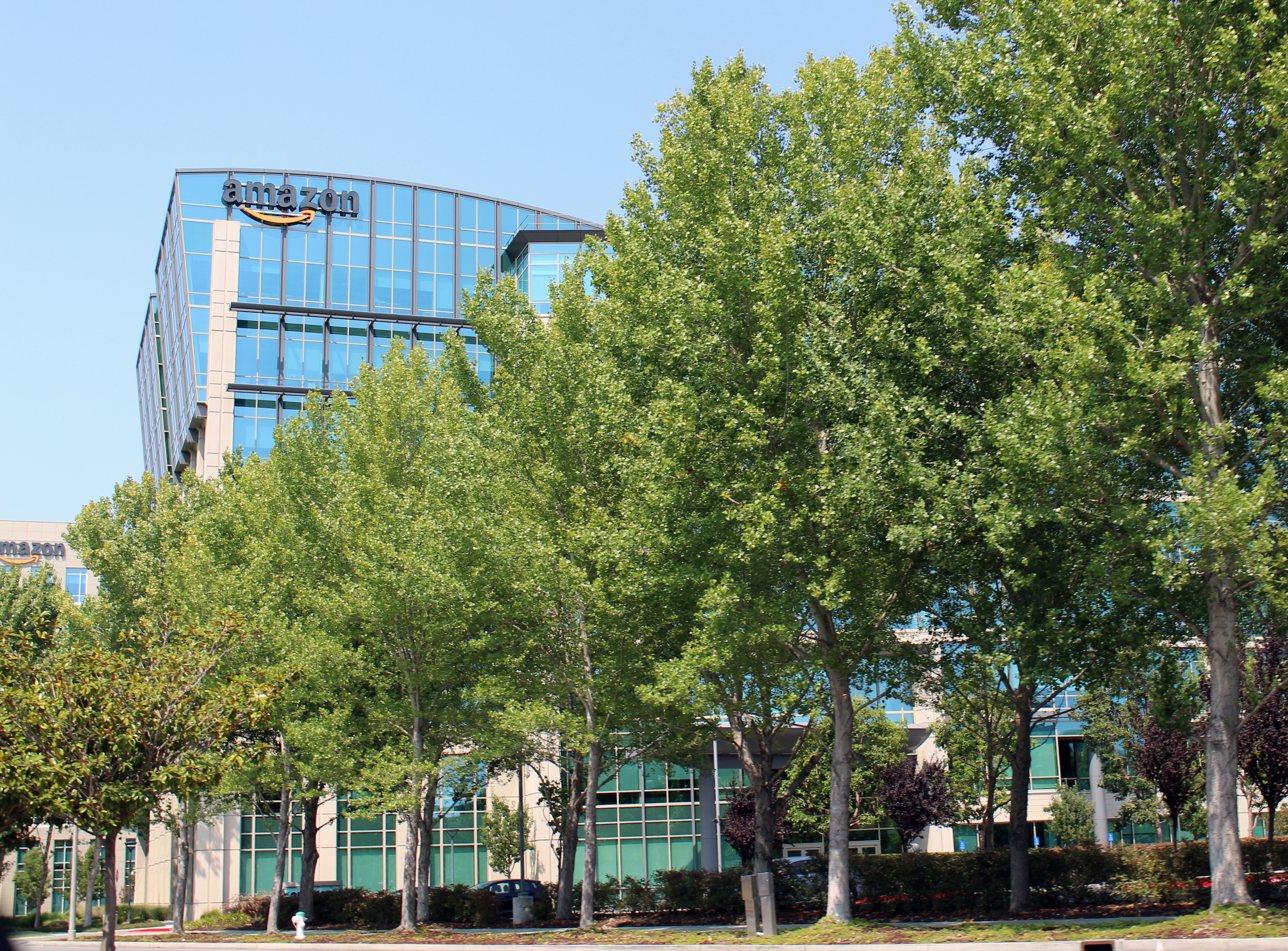
- Amazon Lab126 headquarters in Sunnyvale
- Company type: Subsidiary
- Industry: Research and development; Computer hardware
- Founded: 2004; 22 years ago
- Headquarters: 1100 Enterprise Way, Sunnyvale, California 94089, United States
- Area served: Worldwide
- Key people: Gregg Zehr; (President); Panos Panay; (SVP, Devices)
- Products: Amazon Kindle; Fire Phone; Fire TV; Amazon Alexa; Amazon Echo; Amazon Astro
- Number of employees: 3,000
- Parent: Amazon
- Website: lab126.com

Amazon Lab126 (sometimes known as Lab126) is an American research and development and computer hardware company owned by Amazon.com. It was founded in 2004 by Gregg Zehr, previously Vice President of Hardware Engineering at Palm, and is based in Sunnyvale, California. It is widely known for developing Amazon's Kindle line of e-readers and tablets.

== Name ==
Lab126's name derives from the arrow in Amazon's logo, which points from A to Z—the 1st and 26th letters in the English language alphabet.

== Products ==
On November 19, 2007, after three years of research and development by Lab126, the Amazon Kindle e-reader was released. Gregg Zehr had given it the code name 'Fiona' after the character Fiona in The Diamond Age by Neal Stephenson. It was priced at $399 and included free cellular data worldwide.

Newer models of the Kindle continue to be released, with the latest model called the Kindle Oasis in mid-2016.

In 2011, Lab126 released the Kindle Fire tablet; in 2012, they released two new models of the Fire tablet called the Kindle Fire HD. In 2013, it released the Fire HDX, a high-end tablet.

In 2014, Lab126 released the Amazon Fire TV digital media player; in late 2014, they released the smaller Fire TV Stick. Lab126 also released the Fire Phone that was not commercially successful.

In 2015, Lab126 released the Amazon Echo, a voice command device.

In 2016, it released the Echo Dot, which is a hockey puck sized version of the Echo; they also released the Amazon Tap, a smaller, portable version of the Echo.

In 2021, Lab126 announced Amazon Astro, a brand of domestic robots developed in house.
