= Amazon (company) =

American multinational technology conglomerate

Amazon.com, Inc.
- Logo used since 2024

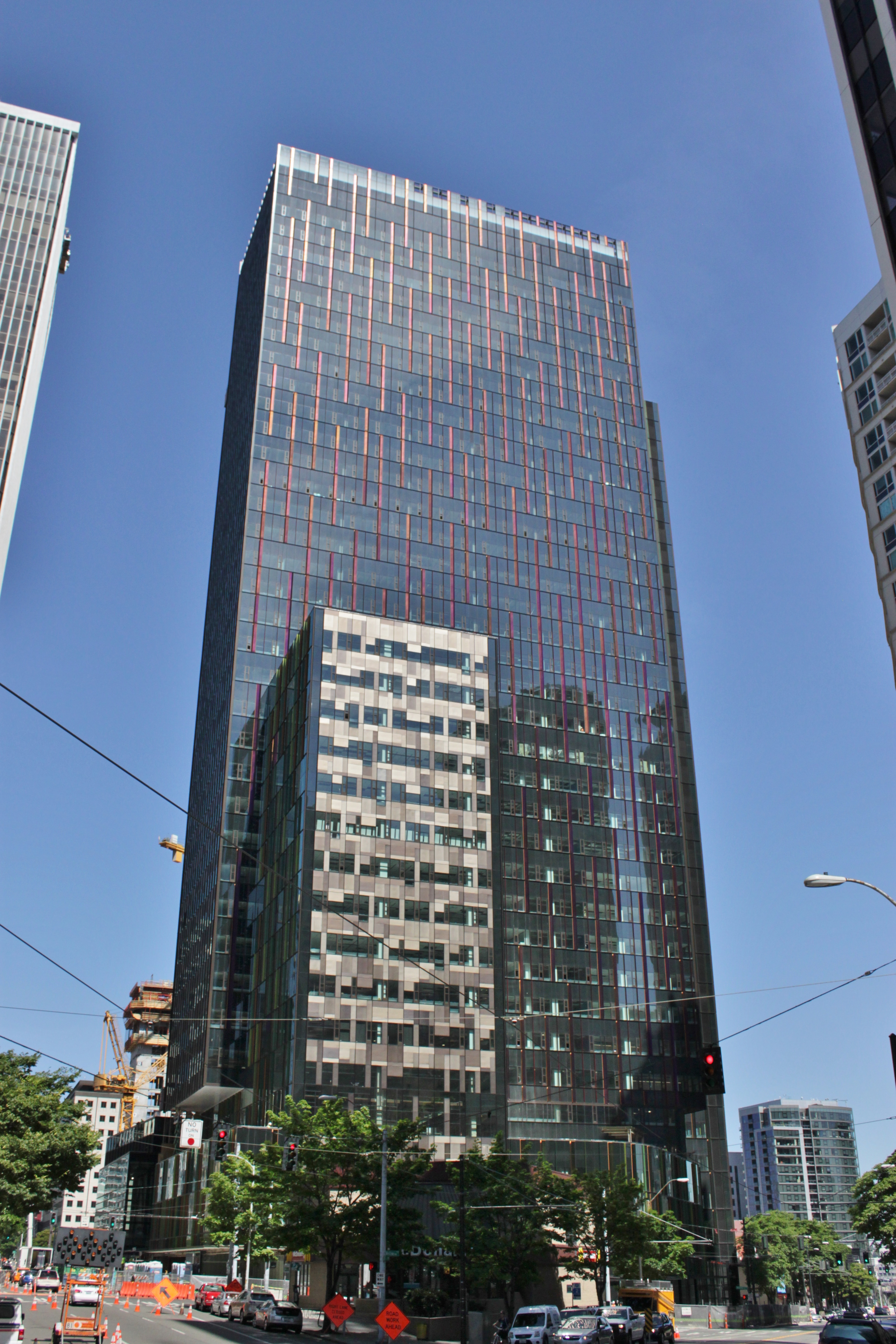
- Doppler, home to Amazon's corporate headquarters
- Trade name: Amazon
- Formerly: Cadabra, Inc. (1994–1995)
- Type: Public
- Traded as: Nasdaq: AMZN; Nasdaq-100 component; DJIA component; S&P 100 component; S&P 500 component
- ISIN: US0231351067
- Industry: Conglomerate
- Founded: July 5, 1994; 32 years ago, in Bellevue, Washington, U.S.
- Founder: Jeff Bezos
- Headquarters: Seattle, Washington, and Arlington County, Virginia, U.S.
- Area served: Worldwide
- Key people: Jeff Bezos (executive chairman); Andy Jassy (president and CEO)
- Products: Echo; Fire Tablet; Fire TV; Fire OS; Kindle
- Services: Amazon.com; Amazon Alexa; Amazon Luna; Amazon Music; Amazon Pay; Amazon Prime; Amazon Prime Video; Amazon MGM Studios; Amazon Robotics; Amazon Web Services; MGM+; One Medical; Ring; Twitch
- Revenue: ▲US$716.9 billion (2025)
- Operating income: ▲US$79.98 billion (2025)
- Net income: ▲US$77.67 billion (2025)
- Total assets: ▲US$818.0 billion (2025)
- Total equity: ▲US$411.1 billion (2025)
- Owner: Jeff Bezos (8.8%)
- Number of employees: 1,576,000 (2025)
- Subsidiaries: List: AbeBooks; Amazon.com; Amazon Air; Amazon Books; Amazon Fresh; Amazon Games; Amazon Lab126; Amazon Leo; Amazon Logistics; Amazon Pharmacy; Amazon Publishing; Amazon Robotics; Amazon MGM Studios; AWS; Audible; Blink; Body Labs; Brilliance Audio; Eero LLC; Goodreads; IMDb; PillPack; Ring; Shopbop; Twitch Interactive; Whole Foods Market; Woot; Zappos; Zoox
- Website: amazon.com

Amazon.com, Inc. (doing business as Amazon) (Note: /ˈæməzɒn/, AM-ə-zon; UK also /ˈæməzən/, AM-ə-zən) is an American multinational conglomerate engaged in e-commerce, retail, cloud computing, online advertising, digital streaming, entertainment, supermarkets, and artificial intelligence. Founded in 1994 by Jeff Bezos in Bellevue, Washington, the company started as an online book marketplace that gradually expanded to include virtually all consumer products as well as many other categories, positioned as "The Everything Store".

As of 2026, it was the world's biggest online retailer. Amazon sells books, electronics, pharmaceuticals, car parts, video games, dining products, jewelry, food, music, and sports equipment.

The company has multiple subsidiaries, including Amazon Web Services (AWS), which provides cloud computing; Zoox, a self-driving car division; satellite Internet provider Kuiper Systems; and Amazon Lab126, a computer hardware R&D provider. Other subsidiaries include Ring, Twitch, IMDb, and grocer Whole Foods Market. Amazon distributes downloadable and streaming content through its Amazon Prime Video, MGM+, Amazon Music, Twitch, Audible, and Wondery units through its Entertainment division. It publishes books through its publishing arm, Amazon Publishing; produces and distributes film and television content through Amazon MGM Studios, including the Metro-Goldwyn-Mayer studio; and owns Brilliance Audio and Audible, which produce and distribute audiobooks, respectively. Amazon produces consumer electronics, most notably Kindle e-readers, Echo devices, Fire tablets, and Fire TVs.

Amazon has a reputation as an industry disruptor through innovation and aggressive reinvestment of profits. As of 2023, it was the largest online retailer and marketplace, smart speaker provider, cloud computing service provider through AWS, live-streaming service provider through Twitch, and Internet company as measured by revenue and market share. In 2021, it surpassed Walmart as the world's largest retailer outside of China, supported by its subscription plan, Amazon Prime, which had 200 million subscribers worldwide. It is the second-largest private employer in the US, second-largest company in the US by revenue as of 2024 (after Walmart), and the largest company in the world by revenue as of 2026. As of October 2026, Amazon was the world's 13th-most visited website. 86.11% of its traffic comes from the United States, according to Similarweb data.

Amazon has been criticized for its alleged business practices, including surveillance partnerships, poor working conditions, anti-union efforts, environmental harm, anticompetitive behavior, censorship controversies, and exploitative treatment of small businesses and suppliers.

== History ==
=== 1994–2010 ===
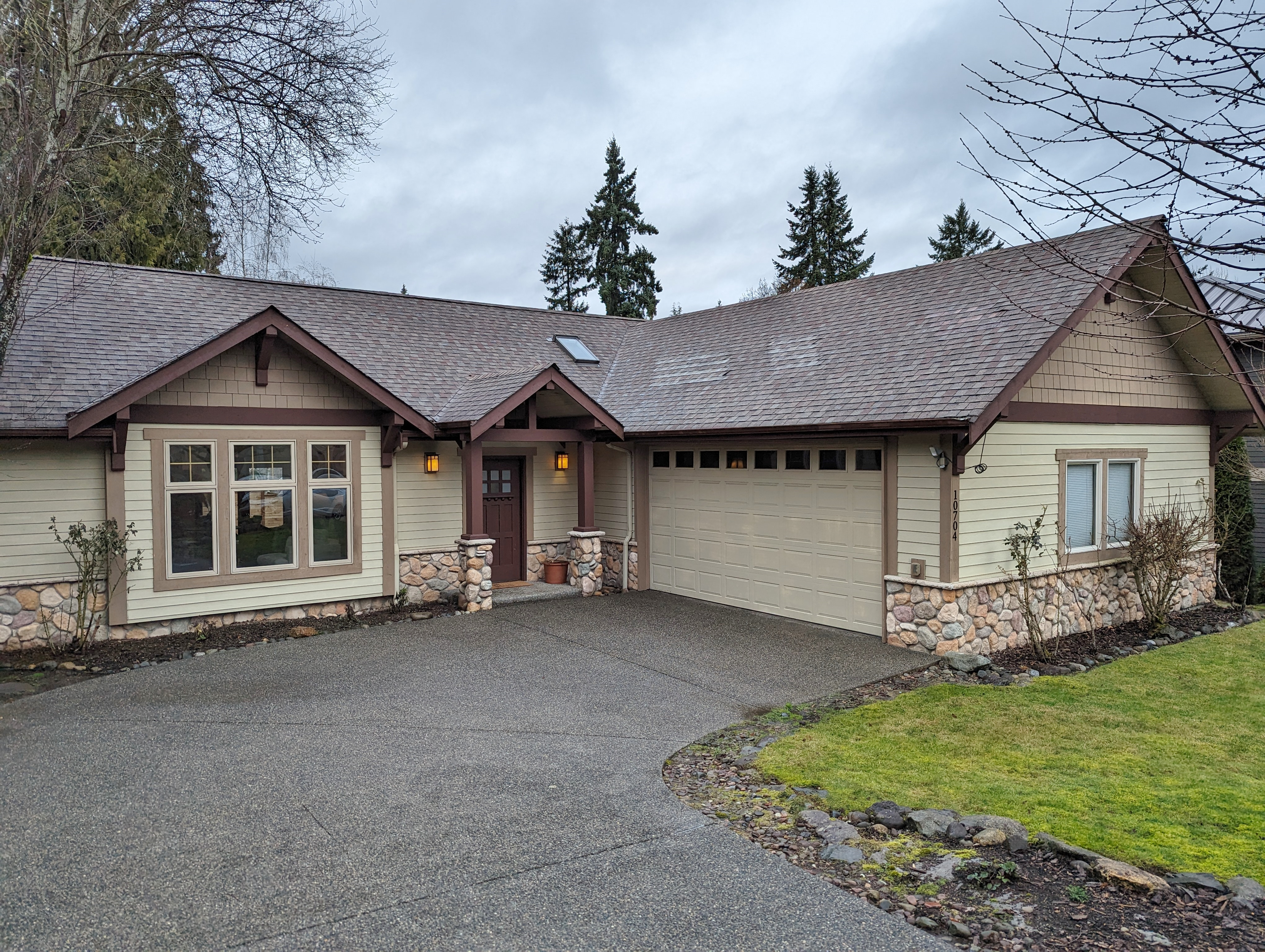
Jeff Bezos's home in Bellevue, Washington, where the company was founded in 1994

On July 5, 1994, Amazon was founded as "Cadabra" by Jeff Bezos, after he relocated from New York City to Bellevue, Washington, to operate an online bookstore. Bezos chose Seattle for its abundance of technical talent from Microsoft and the University of Washington, as well as its smaller population and the proximity to a major book distribution warehouse in Roseburg, Oregon. Seattle beat out Portland, Oregon and Boulder, Colorado.

In November 1994, Bezos renamed the company Amazon to reflect his ambitions for his company. (Amazon is the world's largest river.)

On July 16, 1995, the Amazon website launched, initially sourcing its books directly from wholesalers and publishers.

In May 1997, Amazon went public.

In 1998, Amazon began selling music and videos. It began international operations by acquiring online booksellers in the UK and Germany. In 1999, it expanded to sell more products, including music, video games, consumer electronics, home improvement items, software, games, and toys.

In 2000, US toy retailer Toys "R" Us entered into a 10-year agreement with Amazon, valued at $50 million per year plus a cut of sales, under which Toys "R" Us would be the exclusive supplier of toys and baby products on the service, and the chain's website would redirect to Amazon's Toys & Games category. In 2004, Toys "R" Us sued Amazon, claiming that because of a perceived lack of variety in Toys "R" Us stock, Amazon had knowingly allowed third-party sellers to offer items on the service in categories that Toys "R" Us had been granted exclusivity. In 2006, a court ruled in favor of Toys "R" Us, giving it the right to unwind its agreement with Amazon and establish its independent e-commerce website. The company was later awarded $51 million in damages.

In 2001, Amazon entered into a similar agreement with Borders, under which Amazon would comanage Borders.com as a co-branded service. Borders pulled out of the arrangement in 2007.

In 2002, the company launched Amazon Web Services (AWS), which initially focused on providing APIs for web developers to build web applications on top of Amazon's e-commerce platform. In 2004, AWS expanded to provide website popularity statistics and web crawler data from its Alexa Web Information Service. AWS later shifted toward providing enterprise services with Simple Storage Service (S3) in 2006, and Elastic Compute Cloud (EC2) in 2008, allowing companies to rent data storage and computing power.

In 2006, Amazon launched the Fulfillment by Amazon program, which allowed individuals and small companies (called "third-party sellers") to sell products through Amazon's warehouses and fulfillment infrastructure.

In March 2008, Amazon bought Audible for about $300 million.

The AmazonBasics brand was introduced in 2009, offering a range of Amazon-branded products.

In June 2010, Amazon Seller Product Suggestions was launched.

=== 2011–2020 ===
On October 18, 2011, Amazon.com announced a partnership with DC Comics for the exclusive digital rights to many popular comics, including Superman, Batman, Green Lantern, Sandman, and Watchmen. The partnership caused booksellers such as Barnes & Noble to remove these titles from its shelves.

Amazon acquired Kiva Systems, a warehouse automation company, in 2012.

Amazon bought Goodreads in March 2013.

In November 2013, Amazon announced a partnership with the US Postal Service to begin delivering orders on Sundays. The service, included in Amazon's standard shipping rates, initiated in metropolitan areas of Greater Los Angeles and New York, with plans to expand into Dallas, Houston, New Orleans and Phoenix by 2014.

Amazon acquired Twitch in August 2014 for $970 million.

In November 2015, Amazon opened a physical Amazon Books store in University Village in Seattle. The store was 5,500 square feet and prices for all products matched those on its website. Amazon opened its tenth physical bookstore in 2017. All locations were closed in 2022 along with other retail locations under the "Amazon 4-Star" brand.

In July 2016, the company announced that it was opening a 1,100,000 ft (335,280.0 m) square foot facility in Palmer Township in the Lehigh Valley region of eastern Pennsylvania. As of 2024, Amazon is the Lehigh Valley region's third-largest employer.

In June 2017, Nike agreed to sell products through Amazon in exchange for better policing of counterfeit goods. This proved unsuccessful and Nike withdrew from the partnership in November 2019. Companies including IKEA and Birkenstock also stopped selling through Amazon around the same time, citing similar frustrations over business practices and counterfeit goods.

Amazon purchased Whole Foods Market supermarket chain for $13.7 billion in 2017. It had over 300 million active customer accounts as of 2020.

In September 2017, Amazon ventured with one of its sellers JV Appario Retail owned by Patni Group which recorded income of US$104.44 million (₹759 crore) in financial year 2017–2018.

As of October 11, 2017, Amazon Fresh sold a range of Booths branded products for home delivery in selected areas.

Amazon bought Ring for US$1 billion in 2018. On November 13, 2018, Amazon announced that it would divide its planned HQ2 between New York City and Northern Virginia. On February 14, 2019, Amazon canceled its plan for the New York City HQ2 site.

In November 2018, Amazon reached an agreement with Apple Inc. to sell selected products through the service, via the company and selected Apple Authorized Resellers. As a result of this partnership, only Apple Authorized Resellers were allowed to sell Apple products on Amazon effective January 4, 2019.

The Amazon Live e-commerce streaming service launched in 2019.

Amazon experienced rapid growth during the COVID-19 pandemic, hiring more than 100,000 staff in the US and Canada.

=== 2021–present ===
On July 5, 2021, Bezos moved from CEO to executive board chair. Former AWS CEO Andy Jassy replaced him as CEO. In January 2023, Amazon cut over 18,000 jobs, primarily in consumer retail and its human resources division in an attempt to cut costs.

In September 2021, Amazon announced the launch of Astro, its first household robot.

On November 8, 2023, a plan was adopted for Jeff Bezos to sell approximately 50 million shares of the company over the next year with a deadline of January 31, 2025. The first step was the sale of 12 million shares for about $2 billion.

In 2023, Amazon invested $1.25B in Anthropic. In return Anthropic designated AWS as a primary cloud partner and began using Amazon's Trainium and Inferentia chips. Anthropic Claude models became available on Amazon Bedrock. In March 2024, Amazon invested a further $2.75B. In November, Amazon invested $4B more. In April 2026, Amazon invested $5B.

In January 2023, Amazon announced the launch of RXPass, a prescription drug delivery service.

In February 2024, Amazon announced its first chatbot, "Rufus", for use in the US; in July it was widely available to all customers in the US. "Rufus" is available in the US, India and the UK to help shoppers get product recommendations, shopping list advice, compare products, and see what other customers have responded to regarding their specific questions.

On February 26, 2024, Amazon became a component of the Dow Jones Industrial Average.

On December 19, 2024, Amazon workers, led by the International Brotherhood of Teamsters labor union, went on strike against Amazon in at least four states.

On October 8, 2025, Amazon launched prescription vending machines at One Medical clinics in Los Angeles. The machines are operated by Amazon Pharmacy and are able to prescribe a range of common medications, such as antibiotics, inhalers and blood pressure treatments.

On October 28, 2025, the company announced plans to reduce its corporate workforce by 14,000 positions, reported as Amazon's largest round of job cuts since 2022. In January 2026, Amazon announced a second round of layoffs, affecting approximately 16,000 corporate employees. Company statements described the layoffs as part of a broader effort to streamline operations, reduce bureaucracy, and adapt to changing business conditions, including artificial intelligence technologies. Affected employees were offered severance packages and support for internal job placement.

In January 2025, Amazon filed an objection to Saks Global's bankruptcy plan. Amazon invested $475 million into Saks' acquisition of Neiman Marcus, and worried that Saks' bankruptcy would harm creditors and push the tech company further down the repayment pecking order.

In January 2026, Amazon entered talks with OpenAI to invest up to $50 billion. Amazon had a deep strategic partnership with Anthropic, OpenAI's competitor. In January 2026, Amazon laid off 16,000 employees in its second round of large-scale job reductions in three months due to AI.

In March 2026, Amazon pledged to bear the entire cost of new electricity generation to power its data centers.

In 2020, Amazon Fresh opened several physical stores in the US and the UK. In January 2026, Amazon announced it would close all of its Amazon Go and Amazon Fresh stores to shift focus to its online same-day delivery service and expand its Whole Foods Market business. The closure affects 57 Fresh stores and 15 Amazon Go locations, some of which will be converted into Whole Foods stores.

Amazon launched Amazon Supply Chain Services in May 2026.

Launched in 2005, Mechanical Turk provided a crowdsourcing platform through which businesses and researchers could outsource human-completed tasks. The service was also used for human data annotation and review in machine-learning applications, including through Amazon SageMaker. In August 2026, Amazon announced that AWS Mechanical Turk would be discontinued on September 30, 2026, ending the service after more than 21 years.

== Products and services ==
=== Amazon.com ===
amazon.com
- Logo since November 2024

- Screenshot Homepage
- Website type: E-commerce
- Available in: Arabic; Chinese; Dutch; English; French; German; Hindi; Italian; Japanese; Polish; Portuguese; Spanish; Swedish; Turkish
- Owner: Amazon
- Website: amazon.com (original US site)
- Commercial: Yes
- Registration: Optional
- Launched: 1995; 31 years ago
- Current status: Active
- Written in: C++ and Java

Amazon.com sells products in many categories, including media (books, movies, music, and software), apparel, baby products, consumer electronics, beauty products, gourmet food, groceries, health and personal care products, industrial and scientific supplies, kitchen items, jewelry, watches, lawn and garden items, musical instruments, sporting goods, tools, automotive items, toys and games, and farm supplies and consulting services. Amazon websites are country-specific (for example, amazon.com for the US and amazon.co.uk for UK) though some offer international shipping.

Visits to amazon.com grew from 615 million annual visitors in 2008, to more than 2 billion per month in 2022. The e-commerce platform is the world's 12th most visited.

Results generated by Amazon's search engine are partly determined by promotional fees. The company's localized storefronts, which differ in selection and prices, are differentiated by top-level domain and country code:

Amazon Marketplaces worldwide Top-Level Domain Served by neighboring Domain

Sales by country (2023)
Country	share
US	69.3%
Germany	6.5%
UK	5.8%
Japan	4.8%
Other	13.6%

Region	Country	Domain name	Since	Languages	Notes
Africa	Egypt	amazon.eg	September 2021	Arabic, English	Formerly known as Souq.com Egypt
Africa	South Africa	amazon.co.za	May 2024	English	
Americas	Brazil	amazon.com.br	December 2012	Portuguese	
Americas	Canada	amazon.ca	June 2002	English, French	
Americas	Mexico	amazon.com.mx	August 2013	Spanish	
Americas	United States	amazon.com	July 1995	English, Spanish, Arabic, German, Hebrew, Korean, Portuguese, Chinese (Simplified), Chinese (Traditional)	International customers without a localized Amazon website may purchase eBooks from the Kindle Store on Amazon US.
Asia	China	amazon.cn	September 2004	Chinese (Simplified)	Formerly known as Joyo.com CHN
Asia	India	amazon.in	June 2013	English, Hindi, Tamil, Telugu, Kannada, Malayalam, Bengali, Marathi	
Asia	Japan	amazon.co.jp	November 2000	Japanese, English, Chinese (Simplified)	
Asia	Saudi Arabia	amazon.sa	June 2020	Arabic, English	Formerly known as Souq.com KSA
Asia	Singapore	amazon.sg	July 2017	English	
Asia	Turkey	amazon.com.tr	September 2018	Turkish	
Asia	United Arab Emirates	amazon.ae	May 2019	Arabic, English	Formerly known as Souq.com UAE
Europe	Belgium	amazon.com.be	October 2022	Dutch, French, English	
Europe	France	amazon.fr	August 2000	French, English	
Europe	Germany	amazon.de	October 1998	German, English, Czech, Dutch, Polish, Turkish	Also serves Austria, Denmark and Switzerland
Europe	Ireland	amazon.ie	March 2025	English	
Europe	Italy	amazon.it	November 2010	Italian, English	
Europe	Netherlands	amazon.nl	November 2014	Dutch, English	Initially only books & e-books, full shop opened March 2020
Europe	Poland	amazon.pl	March 2021	Polish	
Europe	Spain	amazon.es	September 2011	Spanish, Portuguese, English	Also serves Portugal
Europe	Sweden	amazon.se	October 2020	Swedish, English	
Europe	United Kingdom	amazon.co.uk	October 1998	English	
Oceania	Australia	amazon.com.au	November 2017	English	Also serves New Zealand

==== Private-label products ====
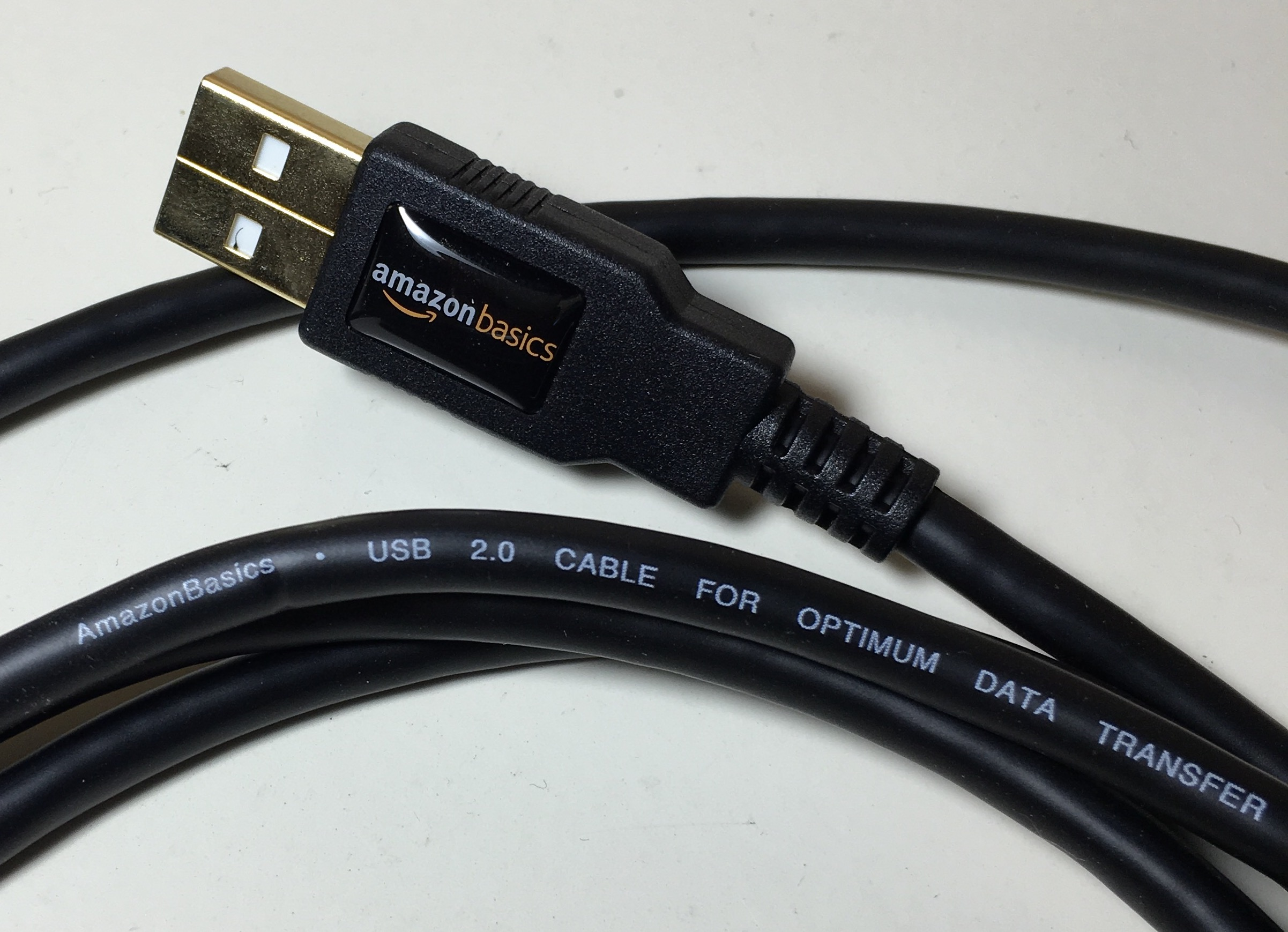
Amazon Basics USB cable

Amazon sells many products under its own brand names, including phone chargers, batteries, and diaper wipes. and features hundreds of product lines. Amazon owned 34 private-label brands as of 2019. These brands account for 0.15% of Amazon's global sales, whereas the average for other large retailers is 18%. Other Amazon retail brands include AmazonBasics, Presto!, Mama Bear, and Amazon Essentials.

==== Third-party sellers ====
Amazon derives many of its sales (around 40% in 2008) from third-party sellers who sell products on Amazon. Some other large e-commerce sellers use Amazon to sell their products in addition to selling direct. Orders are processed through Amazon.com and end up at individual sellers for processing and order. Some sellers lease space from Amazon. Small sellers of used and new goods go to Amazon Marketplace to offer goods.

==== Affiliate program ====
Publishers can sign up as affiliates and receive a commission for referring customers to Amazon by placing links to Amazon on their websites should the referral result in a sale. Worldwide, Amazon had over 900,000 affiliates (2010). As of mid-2014, the Amazon Affiliate Program was used by 1.2% of all websites and was the second most popular advertising network after Google Ads. It is frequently used by sellers and non-profits to provide a way for supporters to earn them a commission.

Associates can access the Amazon catalog directly on their websites by using the Amazon Web Services (AWS) XML service. An affiliate service, aStore, allows Associates to embed a subset of Amazon products within another website, or linked to another website. Amazon Seller Product Suggestions provides transparency to sellers by recommending specific products to third-party sellers to sell on Amazon.

==== Product reviews ====
Amazon allows users to submit reviews of each product. Reviewers rate the product from one to five stars and offer commentary. Amazon provides a badging option for reviewers that indicates the real name of the reviewer (based on confirmation of a credit card account) or that indicates that the reviewer is one of the top reviewers by popularity. Readers can indicate whether the review is helpful or report that it abuses Amazon policies. If a review is given enough "helpful" hits, it appears on the product's page.

When publishers asked Bezos why Amazon would publish negative reviews, he defended the practice by claiming that Amazon.com was "taking a different approach...we want to make every book available—the good, the bad and the ugly...to let truth loose".

Some positive reviews were written and posted by public relations companies on behalf of their clients and instances of pseudonyms users leaving negative reviews of their rivals' works.

==== Amazon sales rank ====
The Amazon sales rank (ASR) indicates the popularity of a product sold on any Amazon locale. It is a relative indicator of popularity that is updated hourly. Effectively, it is a "best sellers list" for the millions of products. While the ASR has no direct effect on product sales, it determines which products appear in its bestseller lists. Products that appear in these lists enjoy additional exposure and may increase sales. Products that experience large jumps (up or down) in the rankings may appear on Amazon's lists of "movers and shakers". For competitive reasons, Amazon does not release sales figures. However, Amazon releases point of sale data via the BookScan service to verified authors. While the ASR was the source of much speculation by publishers, manufacturers, and marketers, Amazon does not release the details of its sales rank algorithm. Some companies analyze Amazon sales data to generate sales estimates based on the ASR, though Amazon states:

Please keep in mind that our sales rank figures are simply meant to be a guide of general interest for the customer and not definitive sales information for publishers—we assume you have this information regularly from your distribution sources

— Amazon.com Help

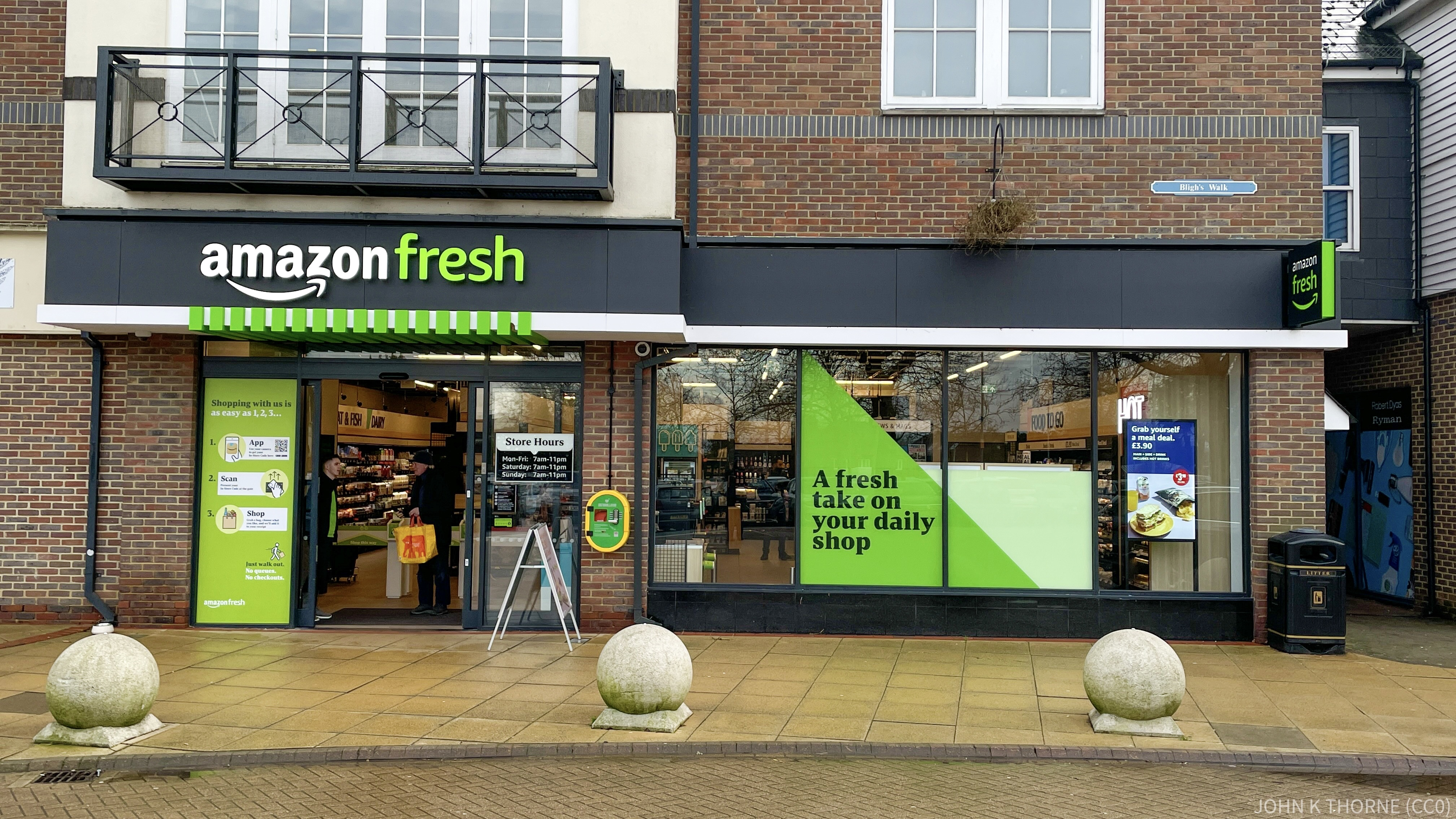
Amazon Fresh store in Sevenoaks, UK

=== Services ===
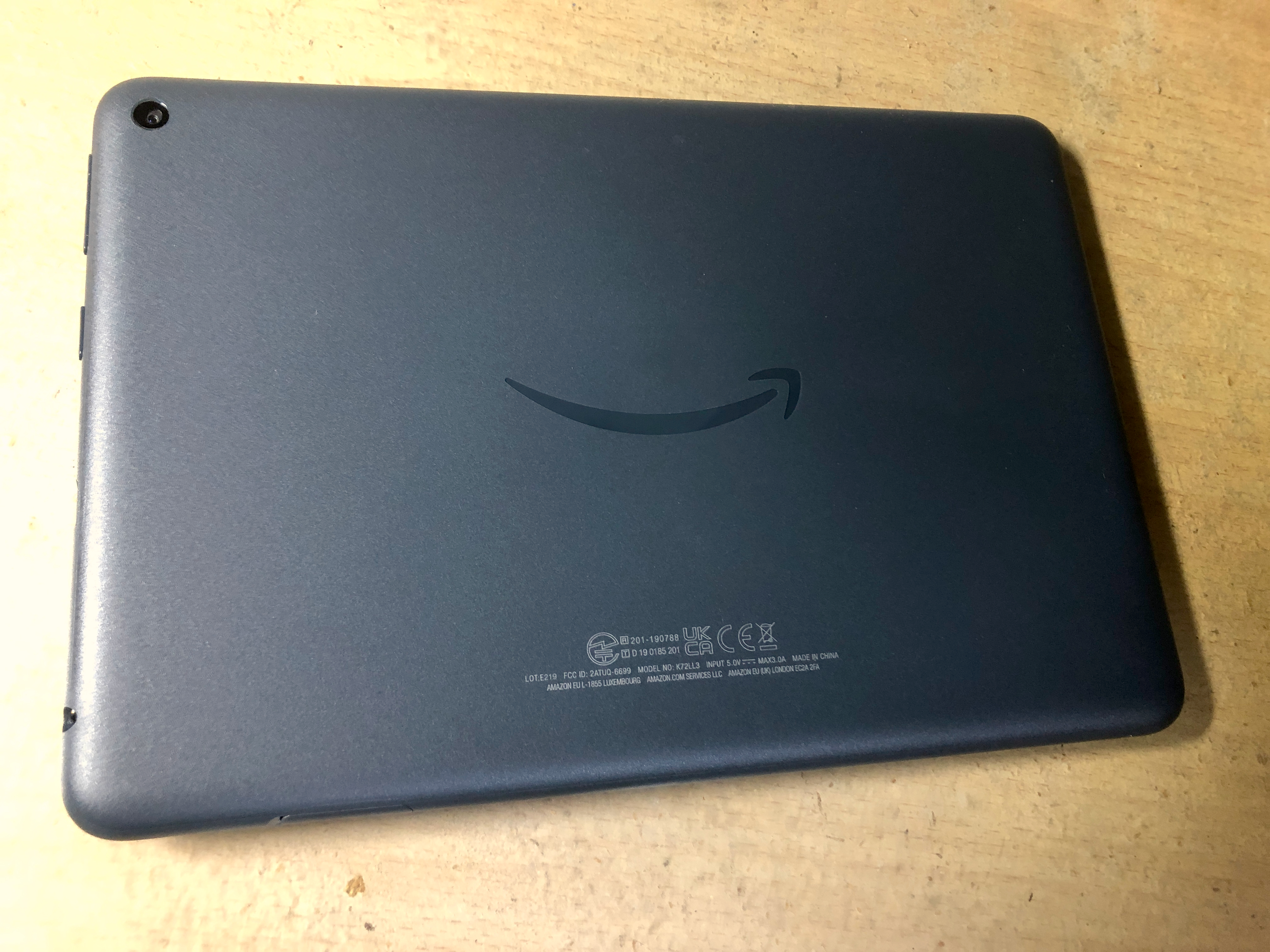
Amazon Fire tablet

Amazon services include its digital assistant Alexa, Amazon Music, and Prime Video for music and videos respectively, the Amazon Appstore for Android apps. Audible provides audiobooks for purchase and listening.

RXPass is a US prescription drug delivery service. US Amazon Prime members can pay a $5 monthly fee for access to 60 medications. Beneficiaries of government healthcare programs such as Medicare and Medicaid are not eligible.

Amazon Live is an e-commerce live-streaming service. The service allows promoters to stream live videos promoting or sponsoring products. Promoters (mainly celebrities or Internet influencers) can add tags to add context. Other users can watch and send messages to a global chat for any stream. In 2023 roughly a billion total viewers watched streams in the US and India. The platform is integrated into Amazon Freevee and Amazon Prime Video.

=== Hardware ===
Amazon offers the Kindle line of electronic paper e-readers, Fire and Fire HD color LCD tablets.

Astro is a household robot, powered by Alexa. It can be remote-controlled, to check on pets, people, or home security. It notifies owners of unusual events.

=== Subsidiaries ===
Amazon owns over 100 subsidiaries, including Amazon Web Services, Audible, Diapers.com, Goodreads, IMDb, Kiva Systems (now Amazon Robotics), One Medical, Shopbop, Teachstreet, Twitch, Zappos, and Zoox.

==== Amazon Web Services ====
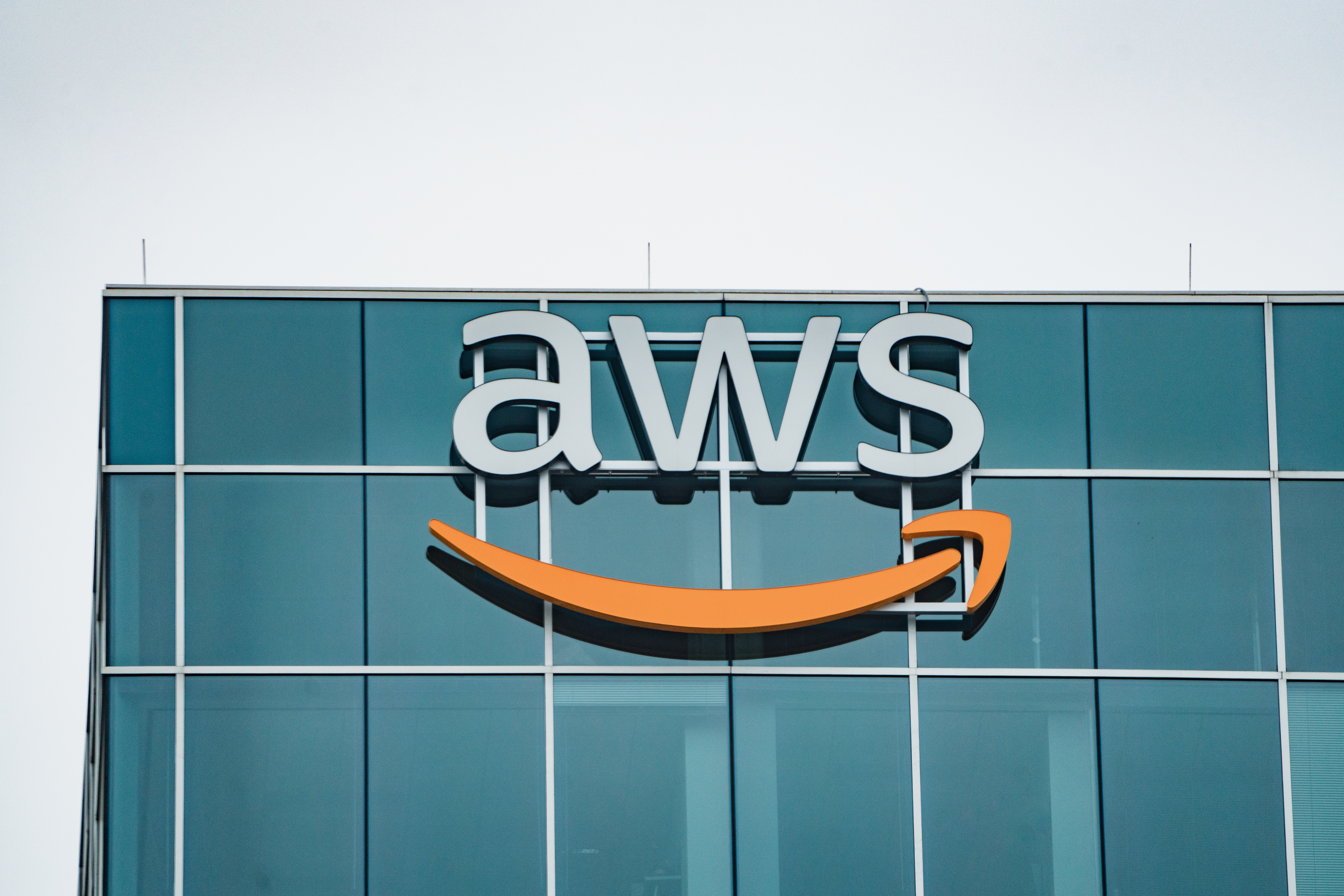
Amazon Web Services, HOU-14

Amazon Web Services, Inc. (AWS) is a subsidiary of Amazon that provides on-demand cloud computing platforms and APIs to individuals, companies, and governments, on a metered, pay-as-you-go basis.

Clients often use this in combination with autoscaling (a process that allows a client to use more computing in times of high application usage, and then scale down to reduce costs when there is less traffic). These cloud computing web services provide various services related to networking, compute, storage, middleware, IoT and other processing capacity, as well as software tools via AWS server farms. This frees clients from managing, scaling, and patching hardware and operating systems.

One of the foundational services is Amazon Elastic Compute Cloud (EC2), which allows users to have at their disposal a virtual cluster of computers, with extremely high availability, which can be interacted with over the Internet via REST APIs, a CLI or the AWS console. AWS's virtual computers emulate most of the attributes of a real computer, including hardware central processing units (CPUs) and graphics processing units (GPUs) for processing; local/RAM memory; hard-disk (HDD)/SSD storage; a choice of operating systems; networking; and pre-loaded application software such as web servers, databases, and customer relationship management (CRM).

AWS services are delivered to customers via a network of AWS server farms located throughout the world. Fees are based on a combination of usage (known as a "Pay-as-you-go" model), hardware, operating system, software, and networking features chosen by the subscriber requiring various degrees of availability, redundancy, security, and service options. Subscribers can pay for a single virtual AWS computer, a dedicated physical computer, or clusters of either. Amazon provides select portions of security for subscribers (e.g. physical security of the data centers) while other aspects of security are the responsibility of the subscriber (e.g. account management, vulnerability scanning, patching). AWS operates from many global geographical regions, including nine in North America.

Amazon markets AWS to subscribers as a way of obtaining large-scale computing capacity more quickly and cheaply than building an actual physical server farm. All services are billed based on usage, but each service measures usage in varying ways. As of 2023 Q1, AWS has 31% market share for cloud infrastructure while the next two competitors Microsoft Azure and Google Cloud have 25%, and 11% respectively, according to Synergy Research Group. AWS was the first cloud provider to build infrastructure specifically for U.S. government with respect to security and compliance requirements (2011; launched AWS GovCloud), accredited to support classified workloads (2014; launched AWS Top Secret), and achieve accreditation across all U.S. government data classifications (2017; launched AWS Secret).

==== Audible ====
Audible is an American online audiobook and podcast service that allows users to purchase and stream audiobooks and other forms of spoken-word content. This content can be purchased individually or under a subscription model in which the user receives "credits" that can be redeemed for content monthly and receive access to a curated on-demand library of content. Audible is the United States' largest audiobook producer and retailer. The service is owned by Audible, a wholly owned subsidiary of Amazon Entertainment, a division of Amazon.com, Inc., headquartered in Newark, New Jersey.

==== Goodreads ====
Goodreads is an American social cataloging website operated by Goodreads, Inc., a subsidiary of Amazon. Users can search its database of books, annotations, quotes, and reviews and expand the database by registering books to generate library catalogs and reading lists. They can also create their own groups of book suggestions, surveys, polls, blogs, and discussions. The website's offices are located in San Francisco.

Goodreads was founded in December 2006 and launched in January 2007 by Otis Chandler and Elizabeth Khuri Chandler. In December 2007, the site had 650,000 members and 10 million books had been added. By July 2012, the site reported 10 million members, 20 million monthly visits, and 30 employees. On March 28, 2013, Amazon announced its acquisition of Goodreads, and by July 23, 2013, Goodreads announced its user base had grown to 20 million members.

By September 2023, the site had more than 150 million members.

==== Ring ====
Ring LLC is a manufacturer of home security and smart home devices owned by Amazon. It manufactures a line of Ring smart doorbells, home security cameras, and alarm systems. It also operates Neighbors, a social network that allows users to discuss local safety and security issues, and share footage captured with Ring products. Via Neighbors, Ring provides footage and data to law enforcement agencies to assist in investigations.

The company was founded in autumn 2013 by Jamie Siminoff as the crowdfunded startup Doorbot; it was renamed Ring in autumn 2014, after which it began to receive equity investments. It was acquired by Amazon in 2018 for approximately $1.15 billion.

Ring's product lines have faced scrutiny over privacy issues. The Neighbors service has been criticized by civil rights advocacy groups as building a private surveillance network backed by law enforcement agencies until the 'Request for Assistance (RFA)' option was discontinued in 2024. Ring agreed to pay $5.8 million in 2023 to settle a lawsuit filed by the Federal Trade Commission for alleged privacy violations. Various security vulnerabilities have also been discovered in Ring products.

==== Twitch ====
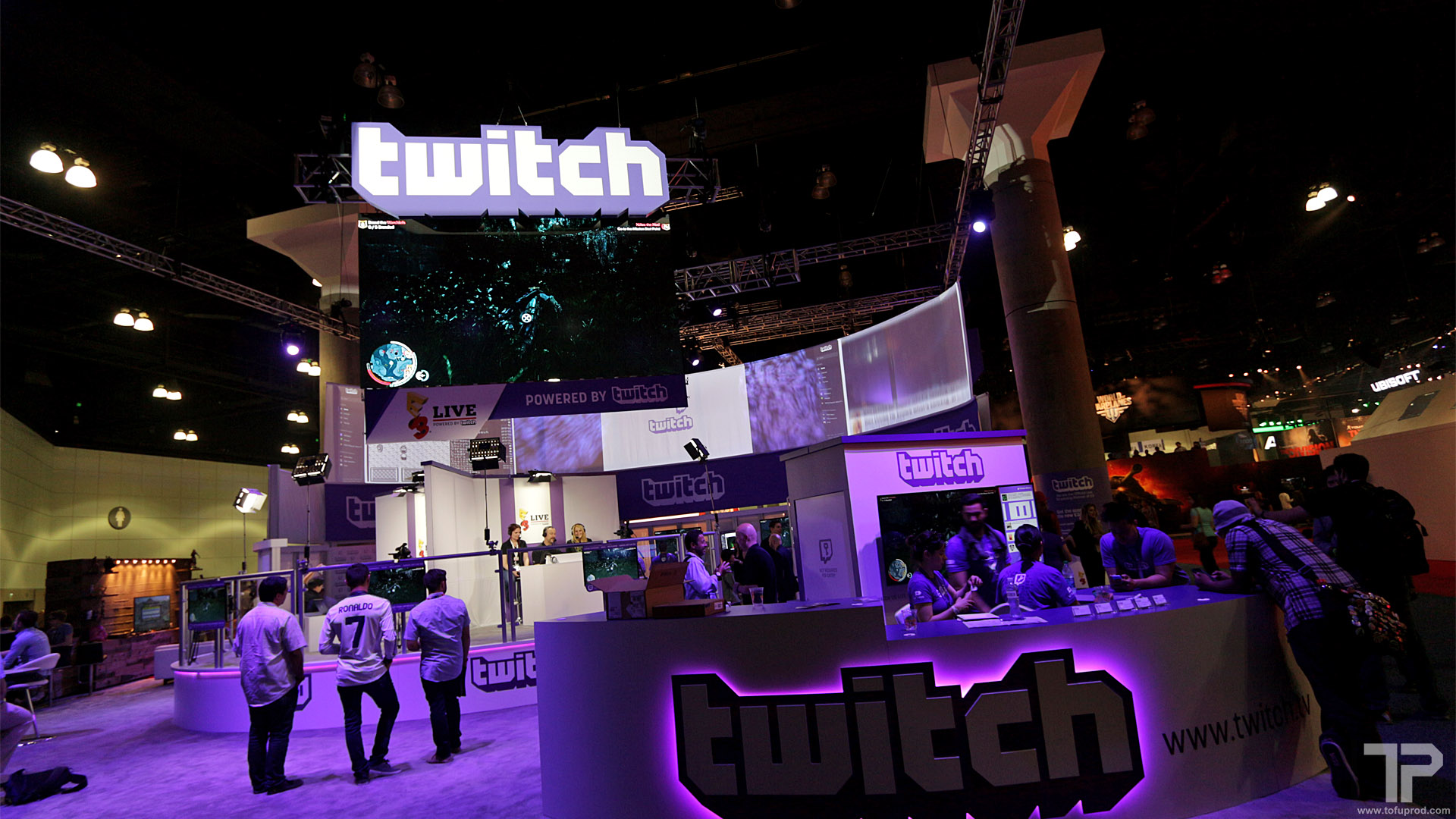
Twitch at the Electronic Entertainment Expo

Twitch is an American video live-streaming service popular in video games, including broadcasts of esports competitions. It also offers music broadcasts, creative content, and "in real life" streams. Twitch is operated by Twitch Interactive, a subsidiary of Amazon Entertainment, a division of Amazon. It was introduced in June 2011 as a spin-off of the general-interest streaming platform Justin.tv.

Content on the site can be viewed either live or via video on demand. The games shown on Twitch's current homepage are listed according to audience preference and include genres such as real-time strategy games, fighting games, racing games, and first-person shooters.

The popularity of Twitch eclipsed that of Justin.tv. In October 2013, the website had 45 million unique viewers, and by February 2014, it was considered the fourth-largest source of peak Internet traffic in the United States. At the same time, Justin.tv's parent company was re-branded as Twitch Interactive to represent the shift in focus when Justin.tv was getting shut down in August 2014. The same month, the service was acquired by Amazon for US$970 million, which later led to the introduction of synergies with the company's subscription service Amazon Prime.

By 2015, Twitch had more than 100 million viewers per month. In 2017, Twitch remained the leading live-streaming video service for video games in the US, and had an advantage over YouTube Gaming, which shut down its standalone app in May 2019. As of February 2020, it had three million broadcasters monthly and 15 million active users daily, with 1.4 million average concurrent users. As of May 2018, Twitch had over 27,000 partner channels. As of January 2025, Twitch was the 30th-most-visited website in the world with 23.46% of its traffic coming from the United States, followed by Russia with 8.87%, Germany with 7.08% and France with 6.26%. In late 2023, Twitch announced that it would stop operating in South Korea in 2024 because of its network fee policy, citing prohibitive costs.

==== Whole Foods Market ====
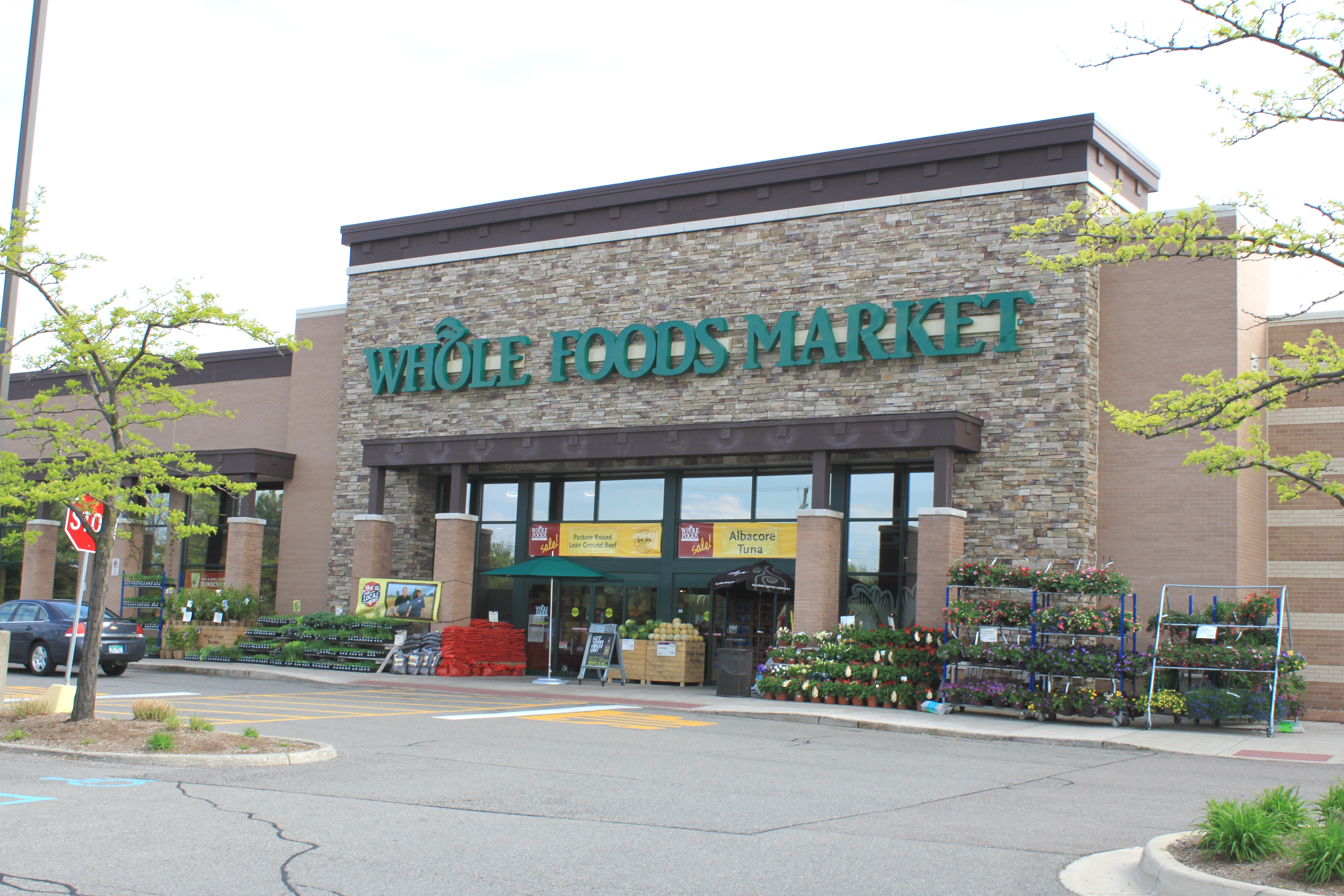
Whole Foods Market store in Ann Arbor, Michigan

Whole Foods Market, Inc. (colloquially referred to as simply Whole Foods) is an American multinational supermarket chain headquartered in Austin, Texas, which generally sells whole food products free from hydrogenated fats and artificial colors, flavors, and preservatives. A USDA Certified Organic grocer in the United States, the chain is popularly known for its organic selections.

John Mackey, the last remaining co-founder of Whole Foods Market, sold the company to Amazon for $13.7 billion on August 28, 2017. As of March 4, 2019, Whole Foods has more than 500 stores in North America and six in the United Kingdom.

==== Other ====
Other Amazon subsidiaries include:

- A9.com, a company focused on researching and building innovative technology; it became a subsidiary in 2003.
- Amazon Academy, formerly JEE Ready, an online learning platform for engineering students, launched by Amazon India on January 13, 2021
- Amazon Maritime, Inc., a non-vessel-owning common carrier (NVOCC), which enables the company to manage its shipments from China ocean shipments.
- Amazon Pharmacy, an online prescription drug delivery service, launched in November 2020. The service provides discounts up to 80% for generic drugs and up to 40% for branded drugs for Prime subscribers. The products can be purchased on the company's website or at over 50,000 brick-and-mortar pharmacies in the US.
- Annapurna Labs, an Israel-based microelectronics company reputedly for US$350–370M, acquired by Amazon Web Services in January 2015 .
- Beijing Century Joyo Courier Services, a freight forwarder.
- Brilliance Audio, an audiobook publisher. The company was purchased by Amazon in 2007 for an undisclosed amount.
- ComiXology, a cloud-based digital comics platform with over 200 million comic downloads as of September 2013. It offers a selection of more than 40,000 comic books and graphic novels across Android, iOS, Fire OS and Windows 8 devices and over a web browser. Amazon bought the company in April 2014.
- CreateSpace, provider of self-publishing services for independent content creators, publishers, film studios, and music labels. It became a subsidiary in 2009.
- eero, an electronics company specializing in mesh-networking Wi-Fi. Eero was acquired by Amazon in 2019 for US$97 million.
- Health Navigator, provider of APIs for online health services. It was acquired in October 2019 to become part of Amazon Care.
- Junglee, a former online shopping service in India. Amazon acquired Junglee in 1998.
- Kuiper Systems, a broadband satellite internet provider.
- Lab126, developer of integrated consumer electronics such as the Kindle. It was acquired in 2004.
- Shelfari, a former social cataloging website for books. Amazon bought the company in August 2008. In January 2016, Amazon announced that it would be merging Shelfari with Goodreads and closing Shelfari.
- PillPack, an online pharmacy. It was acquired in 2018 for under $1 billion.
- Souq, the former largest e-commerce platform in the Arab world. On March 28, 2017, Amazon acquired Souq.com for $580 million. The company was re-branded as Amazon.
- Zoox, robotaxi operator.

Amazon also has investments in renewable energy, including plans to fund four small nuclear reactors at the Xe-100 reactor site in Eastern Washington, and plans to expand its position into the Canadian market through an investment in a new plant in Alberta.

== Operations ==
=== Headquarters ===
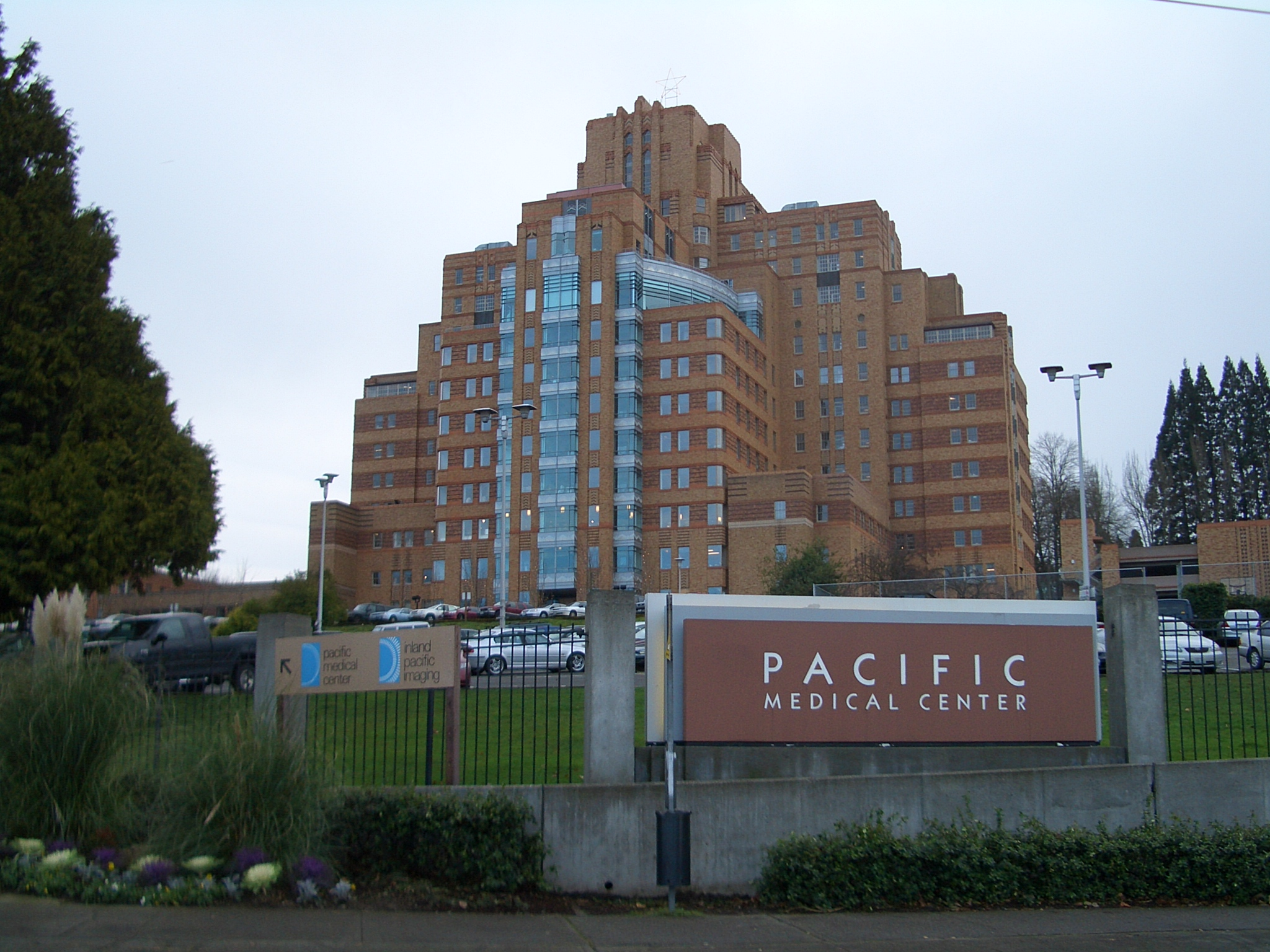
Amazon's former headquarters in the Pacific Medical Center building in Beacon Hill, Seattle

Amazon's global headquarters occupy more than 40 buildings spread across Seattle's adjacent South Lake Union, Denny Triangle, and Downtown neighborhoods. The first 14 buildings Amazon occupied in South Lake Union were purchased for $1.16 billion in 2016. The company was previously headquartered in rented space within the Pacific Medical Center, from 1998 to 2011.

Amazon built a four tower, four low-rise, complex in Seattle's Denny Triangle neighborhood to serve as primary headquarters, though it retained many other buildings to house its more than 45,000 corporate employees. The new campus was designed by NBBJ and named "Rufus 2.0" after a dog, once a fixture of the company. Construction began in 2013. The first tower, nicknamed Doppler, opened on December 14, 2015.

=== Other major campuses ===
Amazon's European headquarters are in Luxembourg's capital, Luxembourg. Its UK headquarters are at Principal Place, Shoreditch, London.

Amazon is also in the process of building a retail hub of operations center in Nashville, Tennessee.

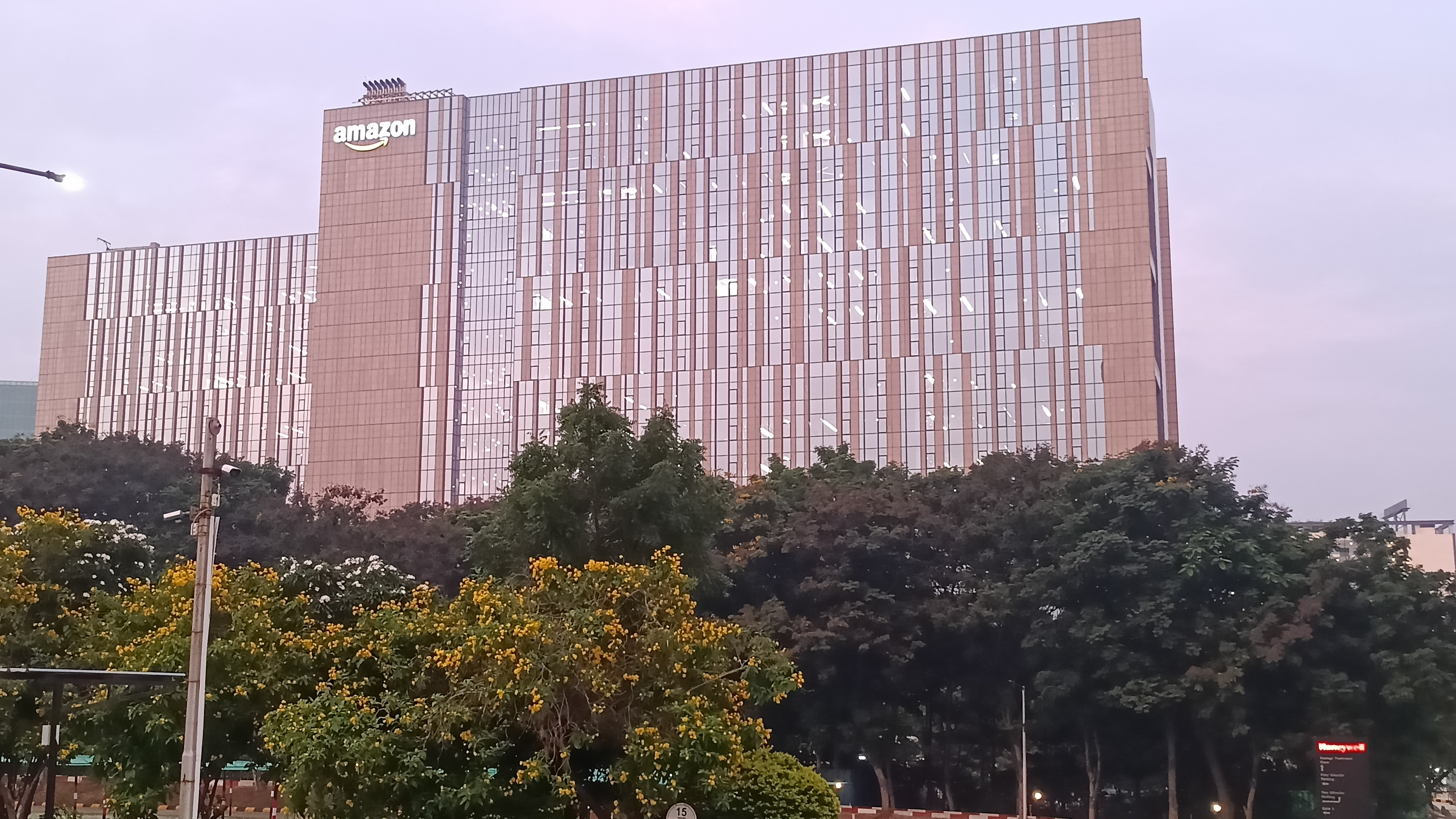
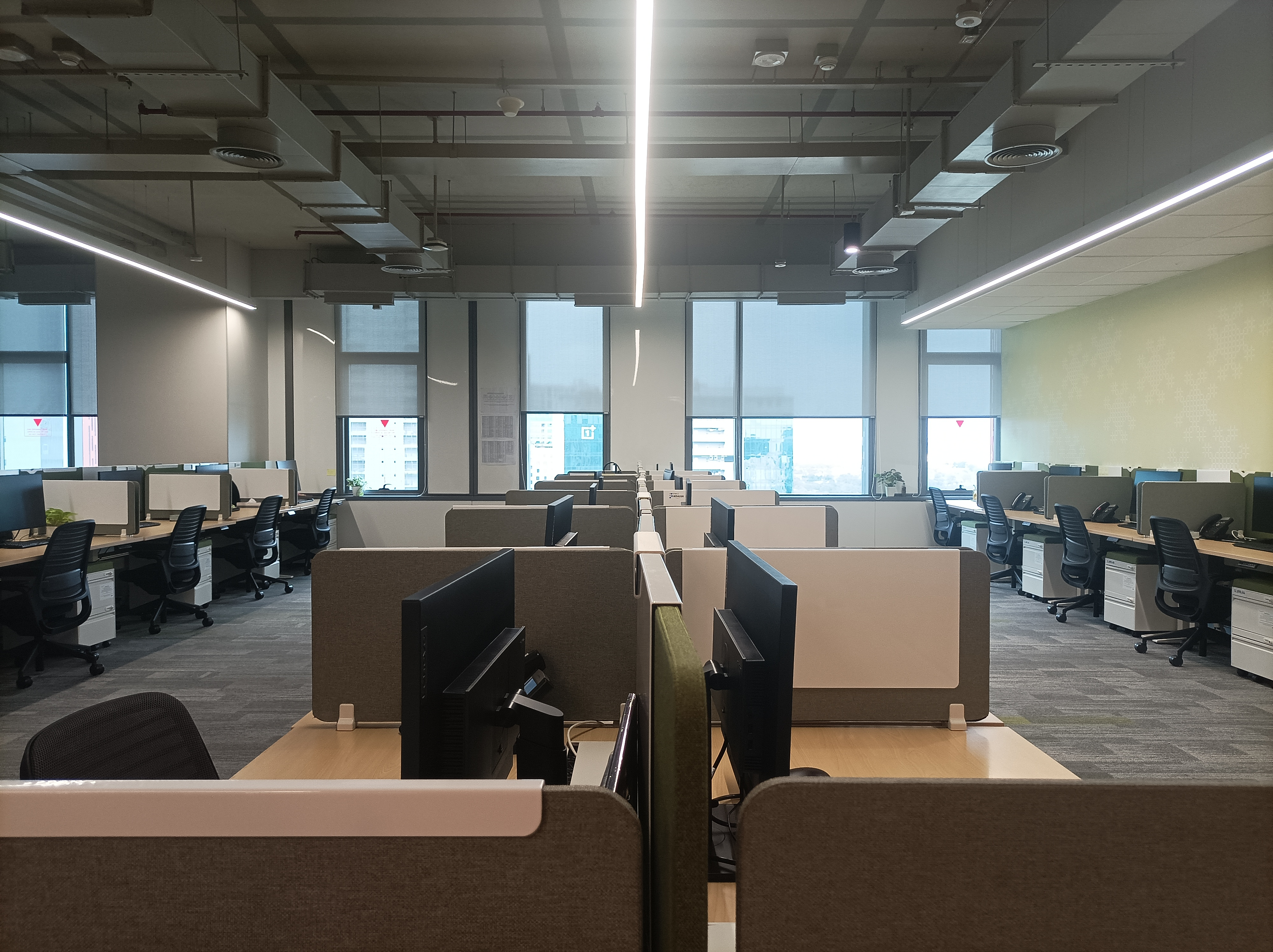
Amazon opened its largest single office building in the world at the Financial District at Hyderabad, India.

On August 21, 2019, Amazon opened its largest campus in the world at Nanakramguda in Hyderabad, India. It is the first Amazon-owned campus located outside the US and features the single largest Amazon-owned building in the world. The 9.5-acre campus houses over 15,000 employees.

In December 2023 Amazon opened its 14-acre Amazon Africa headquarters. in Riverlands in Cape Town, South Africa.

Amazon built a major campus in Bellevue, Washington, a suburb of Seattle, to host 15,000 employees. The company opened its first Bellevue office in 2017. Amazon's largest building in the city is Sonic, a 42-story building, with 1 million square feet (93,000 m^{2}) of office space. It opened in 2024. The Bellevue campus included the 43-story Bellevue 600 tower, the tallest building in the city and the tallest developed by Amazon.

=== Software development ===
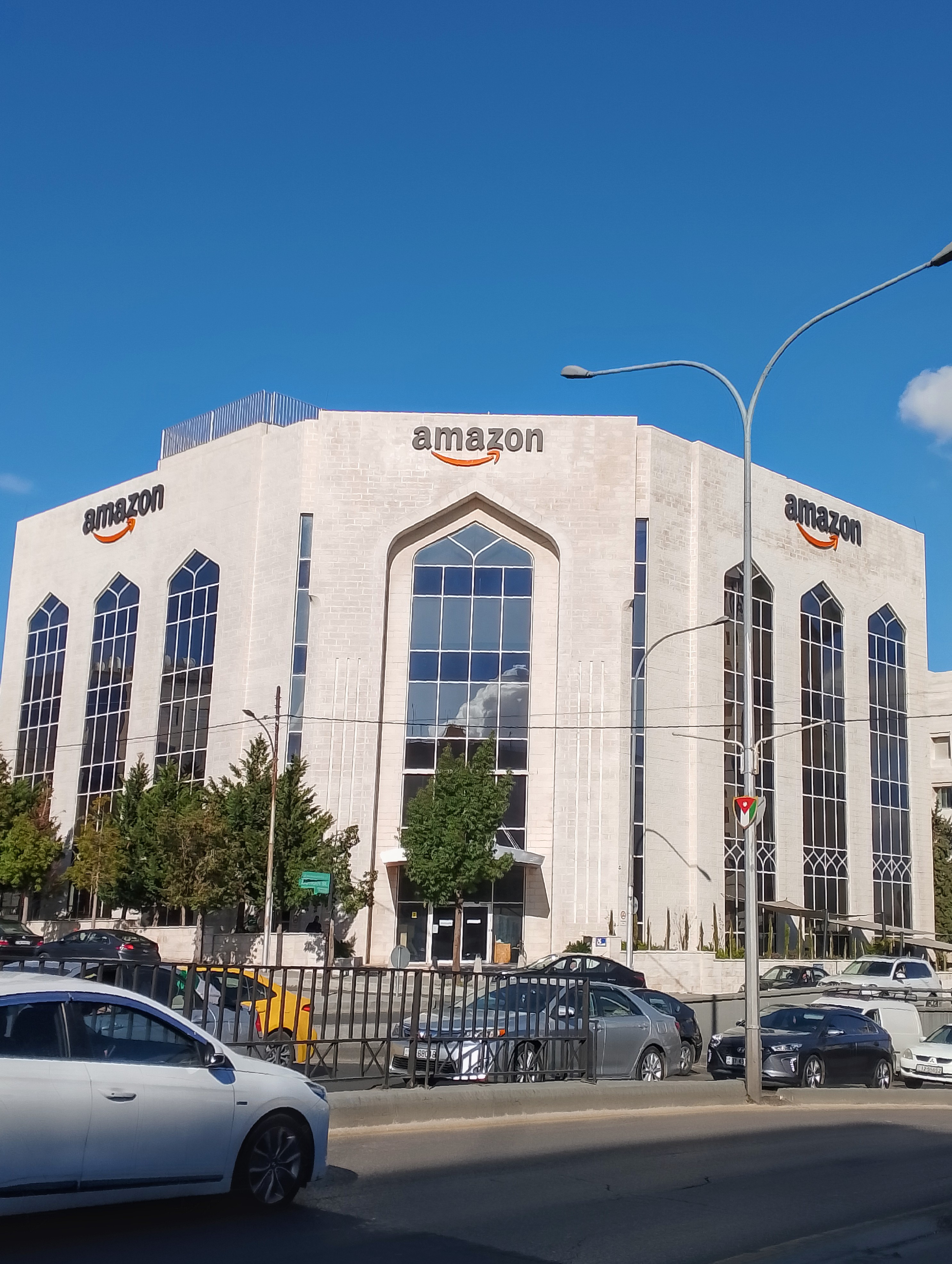
Amazon in Amman, Jordan

While much of Amazon's software development occurs in Seattle, the company employs software developers in centers across the globe. Some of these sites are run by subsidiary A2Z Development.

=== Retail ===
Amazon once operated various retail store brands, but later closed all save for Whole Foods. Most of the stores are located inside of the US, but Whole Foods also operates stores in Canada and the UK, while Amazon Go has six locations in London under the Amazon Fresh name.

- Whole Foods Market (557 locations as of June 2026)

=== Logistics ===
Amazon delivery station in La Crosse, Wisconsin

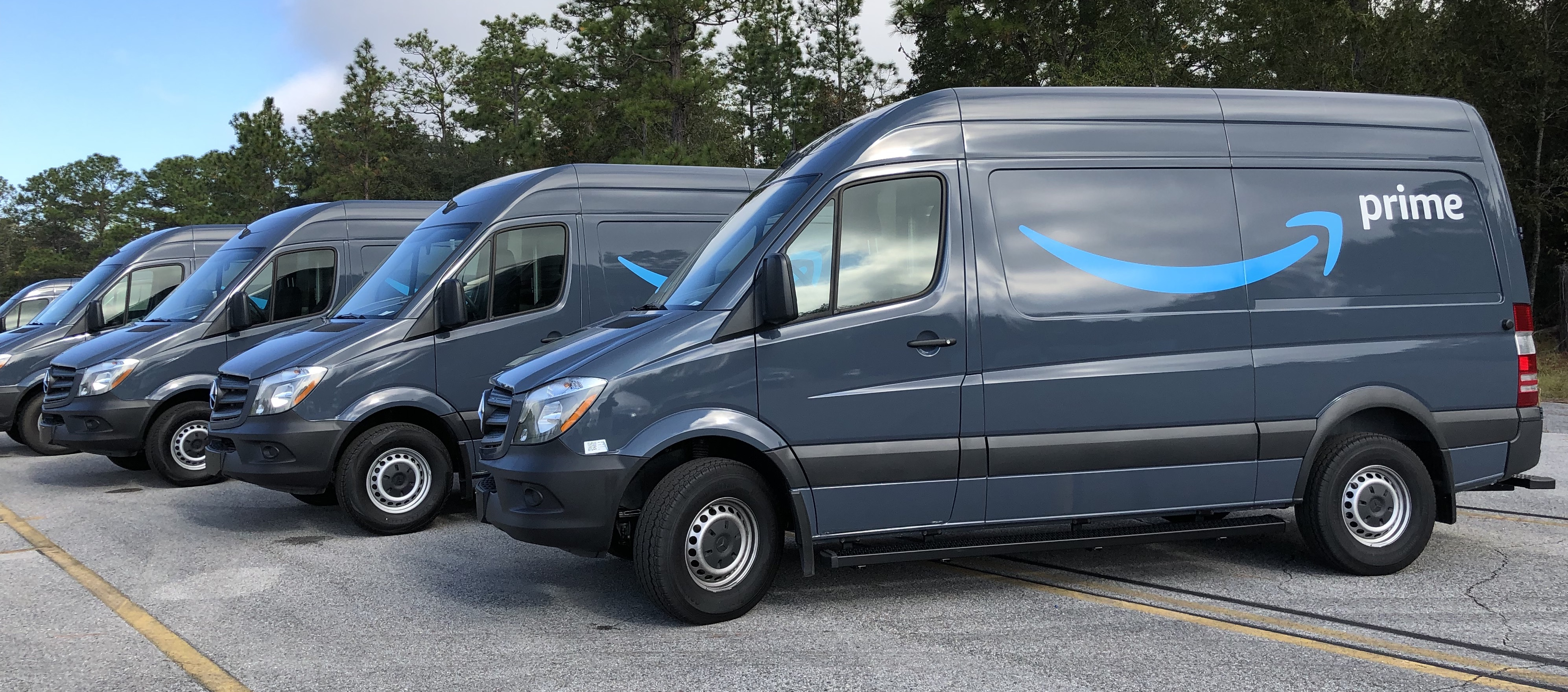
Amazon Logistics Delivery Service Partner company vehicles in Florida

Amazon uses many transportation services to move packages. Amazon-branded services include:

- Amazon Air, a cargo airline for bulk transport, with last-mile delivery handled either by Amazon Flex, Amazon Logistics, or USPS.
- Amazon Flex, a smartphone app that enables individuals to act as independent contractors, delivering packages to customers from personal vehicles without uniforms. Deliveries include one or two hour service via Prime Now, and standard Amazon.com orders, in addition to orders from local stores that contract with Amazon.
- Amazon Freight, a freight brokerage and logistics service
- Amazon Logistics, in which Amazon contracts with small businesses (Delivery Service Partners) to perform deliveries to customers. Each business has a fleet of approximately 20–40 Amazon-branded vans; contractor employees wear Amazon uniforms. As of December 2020, it operated in the US, Canada, Italy, Germany, Spain, and the UK.
- Amazon Prime Air is an experimental drone delivery service that delivers packages via drones to Amazon Prime subscribers in select cities.

Amazon directly employs workers at its warehouses, bulk distribution centers, staffed Amazon Hub Locker+ locations, and delivery stations where drivers pick up packages. As of December 2020, it was not hiring delivery drivers as employees.

Rakuten Intelligence estimated that in 2020 in the US, the proportion of last-mile deliveries by Amazon's directly contracted services was 56% (mostly in urban areas), 30% by USPS (mostly in rural areas), and 14% by UPS. In April 2021, Amazon reported it had increased its in-house delivery capacity by 50% in the last 12 months (which included the first year of the COVID-19 pandemic in the US).

=== Pickup points ===
In addition to Amazon Lockers, Amazon staffed around 30 pickup points in the US and over 800 independent points in India. US locations had large sets of Amazon Lockers and an area for customers to make returns. The India locations were in existing retailers where customers wait for a store employee to retrieve their package.

=== Supply chain ===
Amazon launched its distribution network in 1997 with fulfillment centers in Seattle and New Castle, Delaware. Amazon has several types of distribution facilities including cross-dock centers, fulfillment centers, sorting centers, delivery stations, Prime now hubs, and Prime air hubs. As of 2018 the US had 75 fulfillment centers and 25 sorting centers with over 125,000 employees. Employees are responsible for:

- unpacking and inspecting incoming goods
- placing goods in storage and recording their location
- picking goods from their computer recorded locations to make up an individual shipment
- sorting and packing orders
- shipping

A picker may walk 10 or more miles a day. Employees carry hand-held computers that monitor their progress. Some warehouses are partially automated with systems built by Amazon Robotics. Amazon fulfillment centers host hundreds or thousands of employees.

The Fulfillment By Amazon program handles storage, packing and distribution of products and services for small sellers. Third-party sellers can use FBA to ship for other platforms, such as eBay.

In some fulfillment centers, items are stored on pods and are brought to pickers by four-wheeled robots. The robot slides under and lifts a pod slightly off the ground, before carrying it to a picker station.

In the US, many workers are hired as Amazon employees and granted shares of stock or sign-on bonuses, while others are offered seasonal positions.

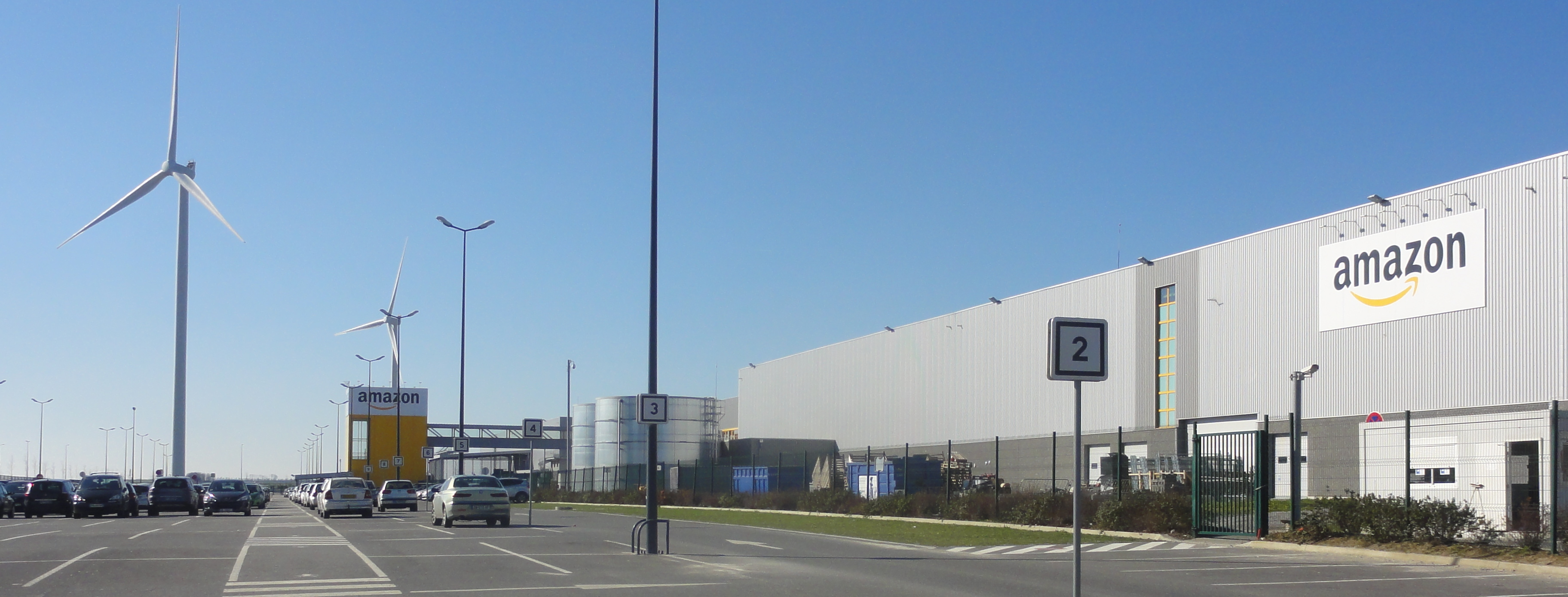
Amazon.fr fulfillment center in Lauwin-Planque, France

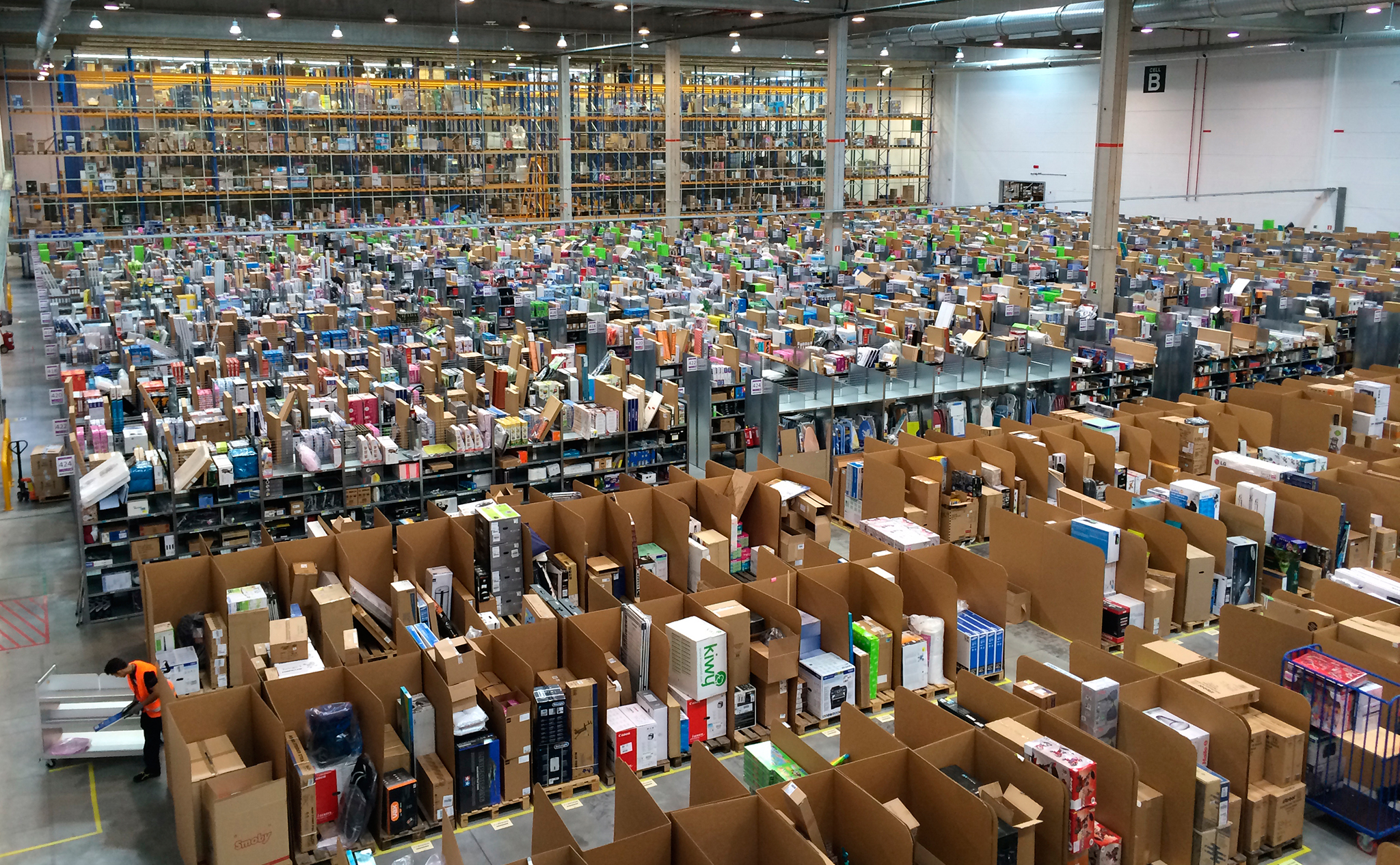
Amazon.es fulfillment center in San Fernando de Henares, Spain

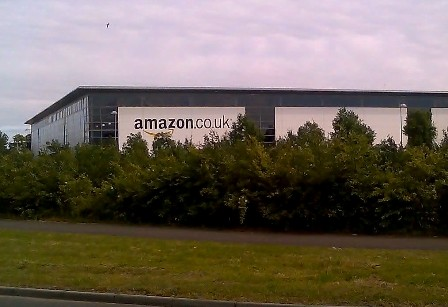
Amazon.co.uk fulfillment center in Glenrothes, Scotland, UK

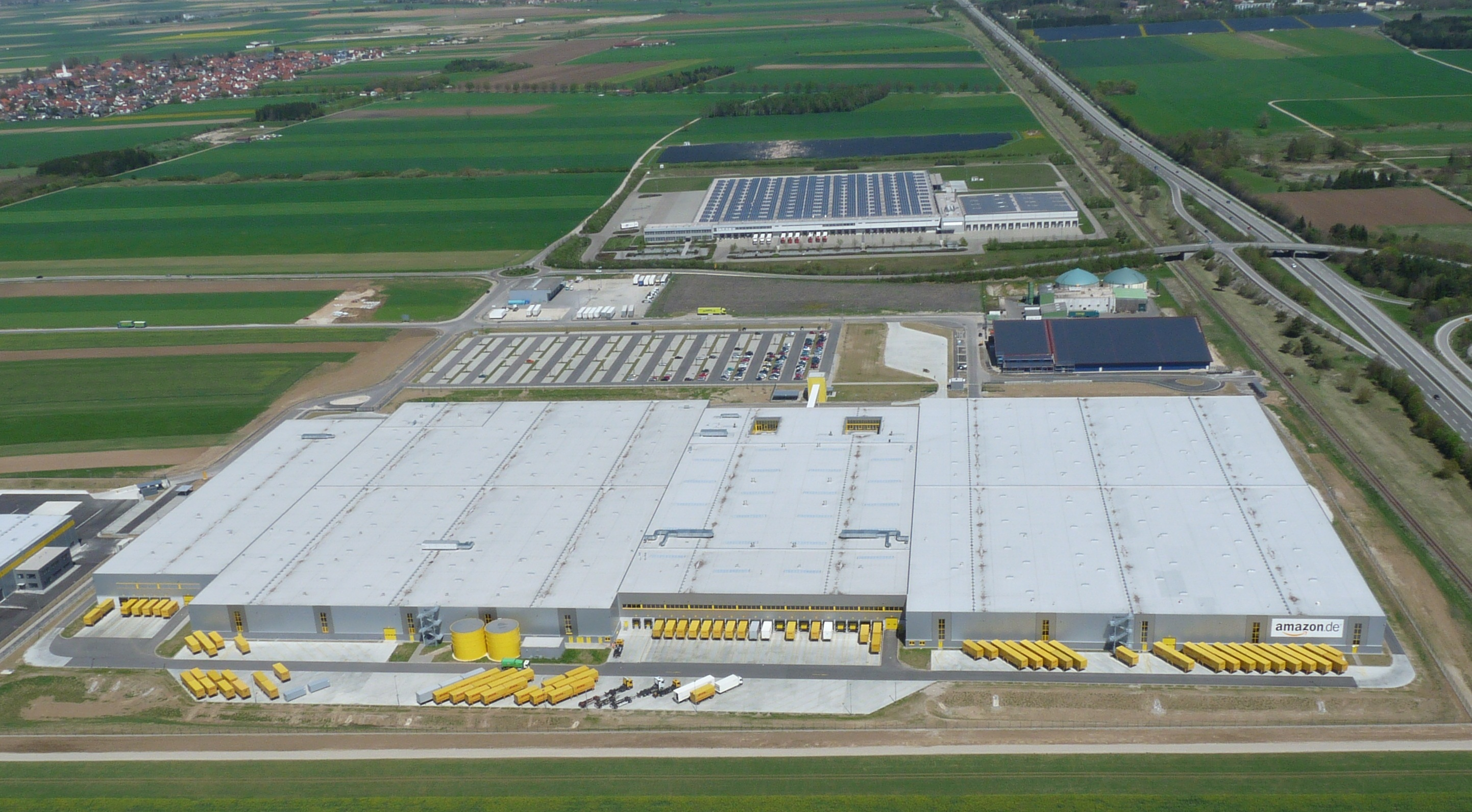
Amazon.de fulfillment center in Graben, Germany

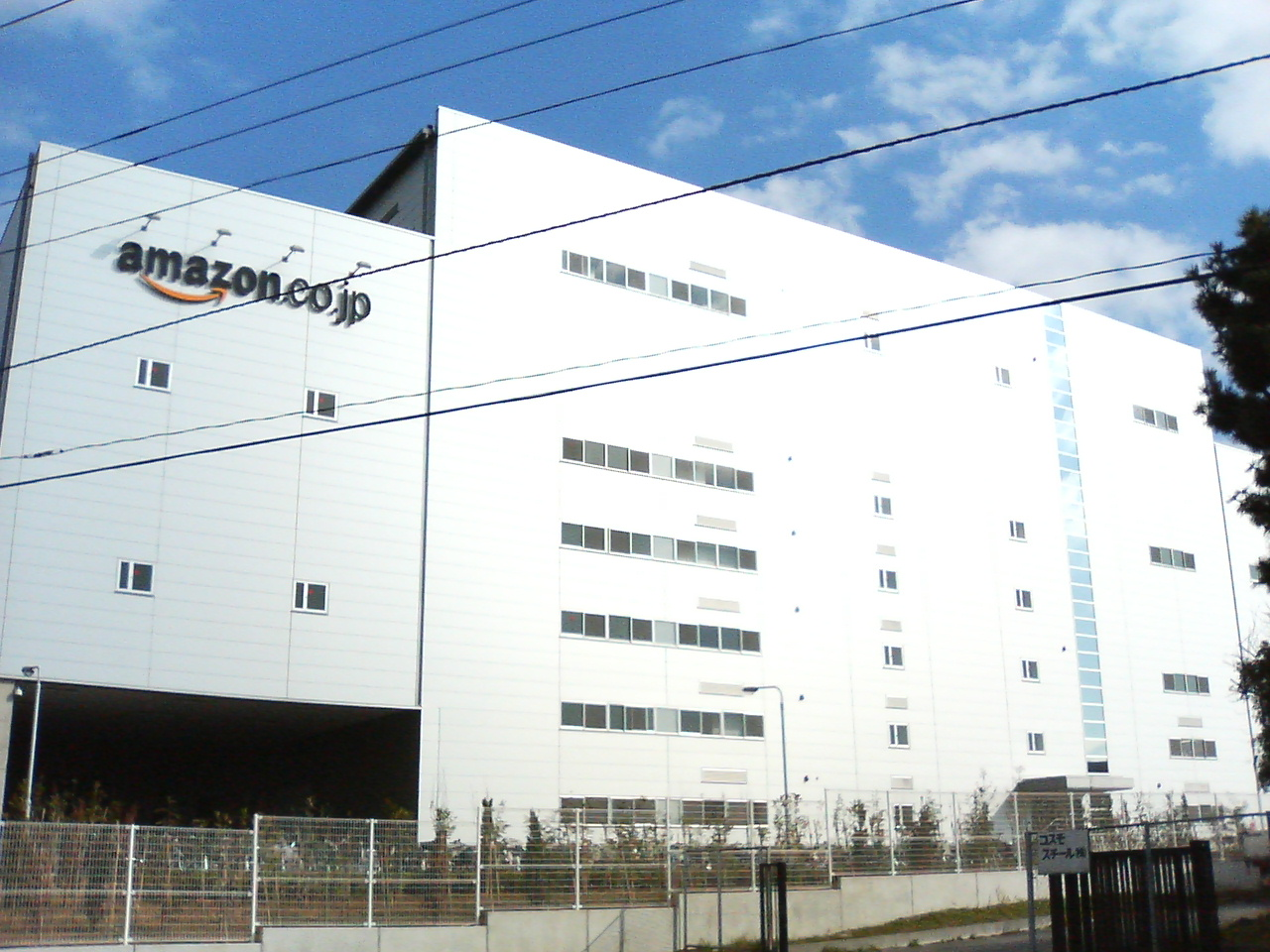
Amazon.co.jp fulfillment center in Ichikawa, Japan

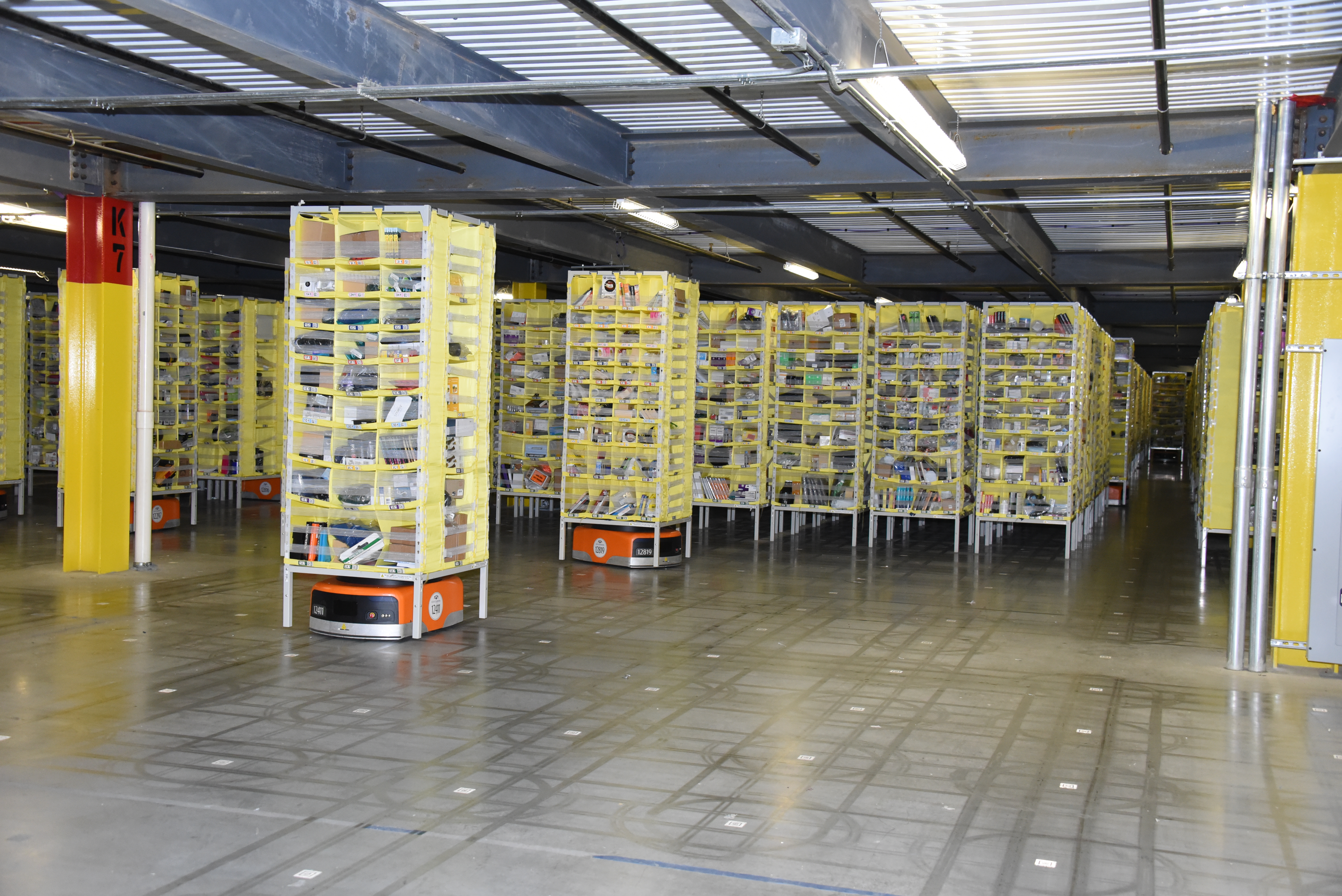
Amazon.co fulfillment center in Baltimore, Maryland, US featuring Amazon Robotics

== Corporate affairs ==
=== Board of directors ===
As of August 2025, Amazon's board of directors were:

- Jeff Bezos, executive chairman, Amazon.com, Inc.
- Andy Jassy, president and CEO, Amazon.com, Inc.
- Keith B. Alexander, CEO of IronNet Cybersecurity, former NSA director
- Edith W. Cooper, co-founder of Medley and former EVP of Goldman Sachs
- Jamie Gorelick, partner, Wilmer Cutler Pickering Hale and Dorr
- Daniel Huttenlocher, dean of the MIT Schwarzman College of Computing.
- Andrew Ng, co-founder, Coursera
- Indra Nooyi, former CEO, PepsiCo
- Jon Rubinstein, former chairman and CEO, Palm, Inc.
- Brad D. Smith, president, Marshall University
- Patty Stonesifer, president and CEO, Martha's Table
- Wendell Weeks, chairman, president and CEO, Corning Inc.

=== Ownership ===
The 10 largest shareholders of Amazon at the end of October 2025:

Shareholder name	Percentage
Jeff Bezos	9.04%
The Vanguard Group	7.96%
BlackRock	4.93%
State Street Corporation	3.5%
Fidelity Investments	3.22%
Geode Capital Management	2.03%
JP Morgan Investment Management	1.81%
Eaton Vance	1.5%
T. Rowe Price	1.48%
BlackRock Life Ltd.	1.45%
Others	63.04%

=== Finances ===
Sales by business (2023)
Business	share
Online Stores	40.3%
Third-party Seller Services	24.4%
Amazon Web Services	15.8%
Advertising	8.2%
Subscription Services	7.0%
Physical Stores	3.5%
Other	0.9%

Amazon.com started as a retail site. Amazon takes a percentage of the price of each item that it sells. It also allows companies to advertise their products by paying to be listed as featured products. In Forbes Global 2000 Amazon ranked 36th (2023).

For fiscal year 2025, Amazon reported net income of US$77.7 billion and net sales of US$716.9 billion, an increase of 12% in net sales from the previous year.

Year	Revenue	Net income	Total Assets	Employees
Year	in million US$			Employees
1995	0.5	−0.3	1.1	
1996	16	−6	8	
1997	148	−28	149	614
1998	610	−124	648	2,100
1999	1,639	−720	2,466	7,600
2000	2,761	−1,411	2,135	9,000
2001	3,122	−567	1,638	7,800
2002	3,932	−149	1,990	7,500
2003	5,263	35	2,162	7,800
2004	6,921	588	3,248	9,000
2005	8,490	359	3,696	12,000
	in billion US$			
2006	10.7	190	4,363	13,900
2007	14.8	476	6,485	17,000
2008	19.1	645	8,314	20,700
2009	24.5	902	13,813	24,300
2010	34.2	1,152	18,797	33,700
2011	48.0	631	25,278	56,200
2012	61.0	−39	32,555	88,400
2013	74.4	274	40,159	117,300
2014	88.9	−241	54,505	154,100
		in billion US$		
2015	107.0	0.59	64.7	230,800
2016	135.9	2.3	83.4	341,400
2017	177.8	3.0	131.3	566,000
2018	232.8	10.0	162.6	647,500
2019	280.5	11.5	225.2	798,000
2020	386.0	21.3	321.1	1,298,000
2021	469.8	33.3	420.5	1,608,000
2022	513.9	−2.7	462.6	1,541,000
2023	574.7	30.4	527.8	1,525,000
2024	637.9	59.2	624.8	1,556,000
2025	716.9	77.7	818.0	1,576,000

=== Corporate culture ===
Jeff Bezos became renowned for his annual shareholder letters. These letters expressed Bezos's perspectives and strategic focus. A common theme was his desire to instill customer-centricity (in his words, "customer obsession") at all levels of Amazon, notably by making all senior executives field customer support queries for a time at Amazon call centers. He read many emails addressed by customers to his public email address. One of Bezos's most well-known internal memos was his mandate for all teams to "expose their data and functionality" through service interfaces "designed from the ground up to be externalizable". This process, commonly known as a service-oriented architecture (SOA), resulted in mandatory dogfooding of services that later became commercialized via AWS.

Amazon used internal recognition programs such as the Just Do It Award to encourage employee initiative.

==== Meeting culture ====
Amazon's meeting culture is document-driven. It is designed to encourage deep thinking, shared context, and efficient decision-making, avoiding polished presentations and large gatherings. Practices:

- Narrative memos: Amazon bans slide decks in favor of detailed memos—typically 4–6 pages of complete sentences and paragraphs (not bullet points). These are intended to reveal weak or incomplete ideas. Memos may take significant time (days or longer) to prepare, sometimes collaboratively.
- Reading: Meetings commonly begin with reading the memo in silence. The information is fresh in attendees' minds, and discussion begins using a shared context.
- Two-pizzas: Teams and meetings are small enough that two pizzas could feed the attendees (6–8 or fewer people).
- "Messy," exploratory discussions: meeting conversations are unscripted, encouraged to wander, explore controversy, expose dissenting views, and explore ideas deeply. Bezos preferred a "crisp document and a messy meeting." Senior voices often delay speaking so juniors can contribute freely. The approach elevates written clarity over persuasion or hierarchy. Meetings may include an empty chair to represent the customer.

=== Lobbying ===
Amazon lobbies governments on issues such as the enforcement of sales taxes on online sales, transportation safety, privacy and data protection, and intellectual property. According to regulatory filings, Amazon.com focuses its US lobbying on the US Congress, the Federal Communications Commission and the Federal Reserve. In 2019, it spent $16.8 million and had a team of 104 lobbyists.

Amazon.com was a corporate member of the American Legislative Exchange Council (ALEC) until it dropped membership following protests at its shareholders' meeting on May 24, 2012.

In 2014, Amazon expanded its lobbying practices as it prepared to lobby the Federal Aviation Administration to approve its drone delivery program, hiring the Akin Gump Strauss Hauer & Feld lobbying firm in June. Amazon and its lobbyists have visited with Federal Aviation Administration officials and aviation committees in Washington, D.C. to explain its plans to deliver packages. In September 2020 this moved one step closer with the granting of a critical certificate by the FAA.

During the second Trump Administration, Amazon donated several times to various events and aspects of his presidency. Along with several other major companies, Amazon donated $1 million to Trump's inaugural fund. In April 2025, Amazon was a corporate sponsor of the White House Easter Egg Roll, after Donald Trump solicited corporate sponsors for the event for the first time. In October 2025, Amazon was listed among the donors funding the construction of the White House State Ballroom.

Amazon lobbies on climate policy internationally. In the US, following Trump's 2025 inauguration, Amazon began frequent engagements with the executive branch to advocate for permitting reform and energy development to support data center growth. In July 2025, Amazon joined policymakers at the Pennsylvania Energy and Innovation Summit, where it supported the development of nuclear energy to meet growing electricity demand, and lobbied for permitting reform to support grid development nationwide. Amazon sponsored the Conservative Coalition for Climate Solutions' (C3) Energy Summit in Washington D.C. in December 2025, which brought together administration officials and industry representatives to discuss meeting the country's growing electricity demand through modernization of the permitting process, investment in energy infrastructure, and scaling new technologies. A December 2025 DeSmog article reported that the company's sponsorship came alongside several organizations that had supported climate change denial, and a continued role for fossil fuels to meet growing energy demand. In 2026, Amazon spent $5 million lobbying against the Delivery Protection Act, a New York City bill introduced by Tiffany Cabán that would require companies like Amazon to directly employ last mile delivery drivers and warehouse workers, as well as set licensing, safety, and training requirements for last mile facilities.

== Criticism and controversies ==
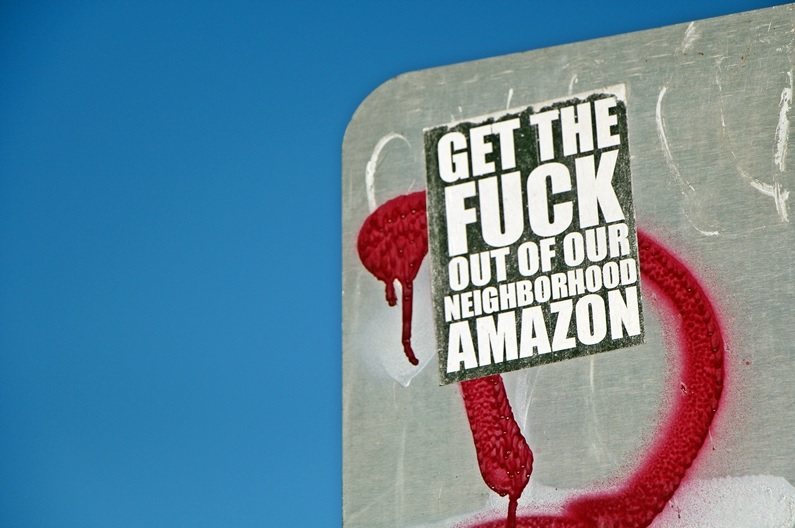
A sticker expressing an anti-Amazon message is pictured on the back of a street sign in Seattle

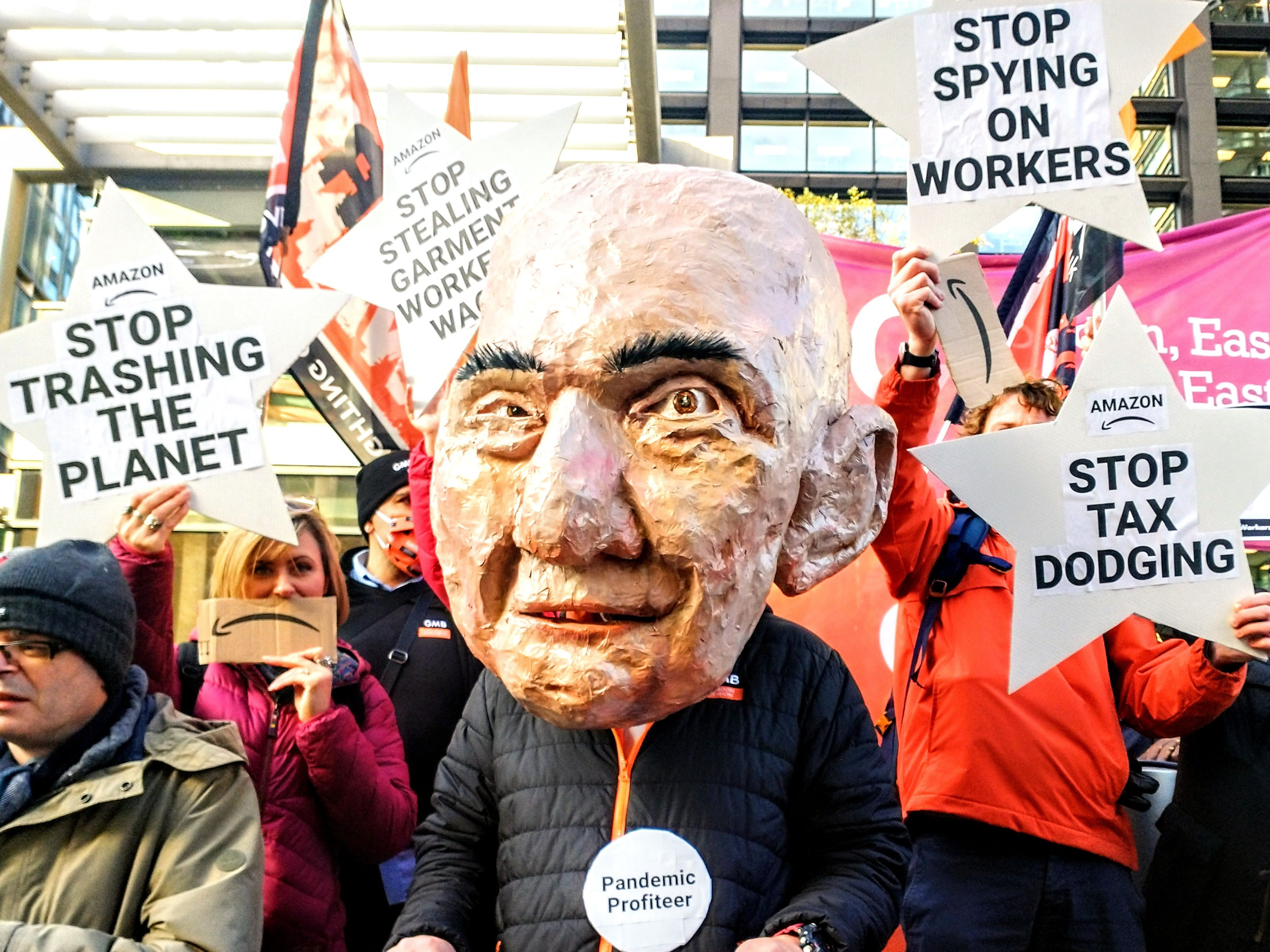
Placards and a papier-mâché Jeff Bezos head at London "Make Amazon Pay" protest in 2021

Amazon has been criticized on many issues, including anti-competitive business practices, its treatment of workers, offering counterfeit or plagiarized products, objectionable content of its books, tax and subsidy deals with governments supplying law enforcement with facial recognition surveillance tools; forming cloud computing partnerships with the CIA; leading customers away from bookshops; adversely impacting the environment; placing a low priority on warehouse conditions for workers; actively opposing unionization efforts; remotely deleting content purchased by Amazon Kindle users; taking public subsidies; seeking to patent its 1-Click technology; engaging in anti-competitive actions and price discrimination; and reclassifying LGBTQ books as adult content. Criticism has also concerned various decisions over whether to censor or publish content such as the WikiLeaks website, works containing libel, anti-LGBT merchandise, and material facilitating dog fighting, cockfighting, or pedophile activities.

An article published by Time in the wake of social media website Parler's termination of service by Amazon Web Service highlights the power companies like Amazon now have over the internet. In December 2011, Amazon faced a backlash from small businesses for running a one-day deal to promote its new Price Check app. Shoppers who used the app to check prices in a brick-and-mortar store were offered a 5% discount to purchase the same item from Amazon. Companies like Groupon, eBay and Taap have countered Amazon's promotion by offering $10 off from its products.

The company has also faced accusations of putting undue pressure on suppliers to maintain and extend its profitability. One effort to squeeze the most vulnerable book publishers was known within the company as the Gazelle Project, after Bezos suggested, according to Brad Stone, "that Amazon should approach these small publishers the way a cheetah would pursue a sickly gazelle." In July 2014, the Federal Trade Commission launched a lawsuit against the company alleging it was promoting in-app purchases to children, which were being transacted without parental consent. In 2019, Amazon banned selling skin-lightening products after pushback from Minnesota health and environmental activists. In 2022, a lawsuit filed by state attorney-general Letitia James was dismissed by the New York state court of appeals. After the COVID-19 pandemic, Amazon faced criticism for complying, under pressure from the Biden Administration, to "reduce the visibility" of books critical of the COVID-19 vaccine, which was revealed after Rep. Jim Jordan (acting on behalf of the House Judiciary Committee) subpoenaed emails between the company and the Biden Administration.

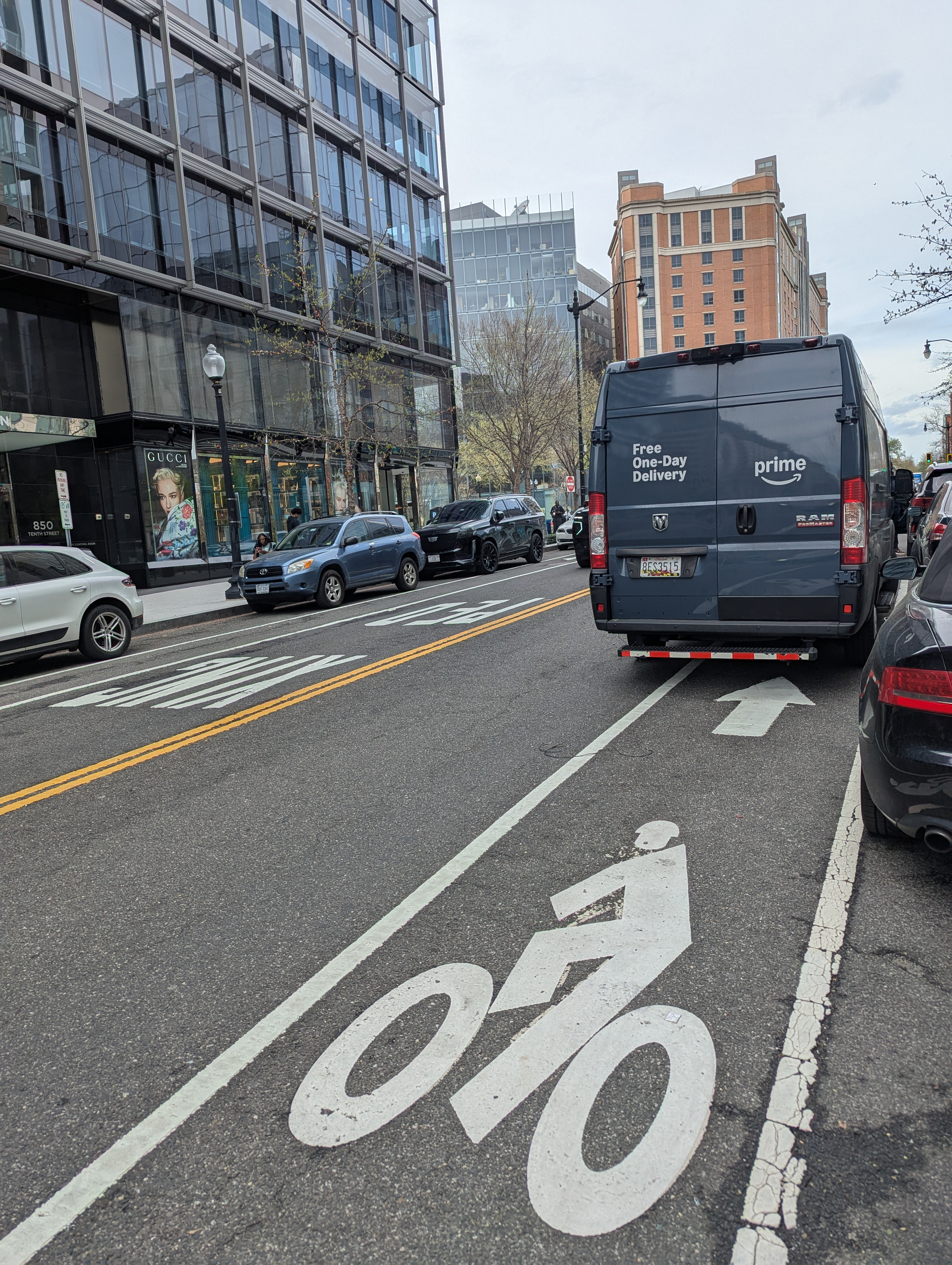
An Amazon Prime truck blocking a bike lane and double parking in Washington, D.C.

Amazon Prime has been criticized for its vehicles systemically double parking, blocking bike lanes, and otherwise violating traffic laws while dropping off packages, contributing to traffic congestion and endangering other road users.

Jane Friedman discovered six listings of books fraudulently using her name, on Amazon and Goodreads. Amazon and Goodreads resisted removing the fraudulent titles until the author's complaints went viral on social media, in a blog post titled "I Would Rather See My Books Get Pirated Than This (Or: Why Goodreads and Amazon Are Becoming Dumpster Fires)."

In 2024, following years of criticism for providing law enforcement footage in the custody of Ring (a home security company owned by Amazon) without a warrant, Ring has halted this practice. It received cautious praise from privacy-focused organizations such as the Electronic Frontier Foundation for this change.

In February 2025, Sky accused Amazon of not doing enough to prevent the piracy of its sports rights via "jailbroken" Fire Sticks.

Project Nimbus is a contract by which Amazon and Google provide Israel and its military with artificial intelligence, machine learning, and other cloud-computing services. The contract has been criticized by shareholders and employees concerned that the project may lead to abuses of Palestinian human rights in the Israeli–Palestinian conflict. In October 2025, Amazon suspended an employee who posted messages to the company's Slack and wrote a letter to Andy Jassy criticizing Nimbus.

On July 22, 2025, Amazon announced its plan to acquire San Francisco-based startup Bee AI. Bee produces a wristband, similar to most modern smartwatches, equipped with AI and microphones. The wristband is capable of providing summaries of conversations and reminders of tasks, effectively serving as a 24/7 note taker. News outlets criticize the fact that the devices saves transcripts, potentially utilizing it to train generative AI models which require vast quantities of data.

In January 2026, Amazon sent a notice out to cloud staffers in an apparent error acknowledging “organizational changes” at the company. The note also mentioned a "Project Dawn" which was cancelled, although it is unclear what the project is about.

=== Lawsuits and cases ===
In 2025, Federal Trade Commission alleged that Amazon used deceptive methods to sign up consumers for Prime subscriptions and made it exceedingly difficult to cancel. The United States District Court for the Western District of Washington decided Amazon will be required to pay a $1 billion civil penalty and also provide $1.5 billion in refunds back to consumers. In 2026, Federal Trade Commission and 22 states claimed Amazon tripled ad prices for Black Friday and Prime Day deals.

== See also ==
- Amazon Breakthrough Novel Award – Literary award
- Amazon Pay – Online purchase processing system
- Amazon Standard Identification Number (ASIN) – Alphanumeric unique identifier
- Amazon Storywriter – Cloud-based screenwriting app by Amazon
- Camelcamelcamel – A website that tracks the prices of products sold on Amazon.com
- Criticism of Amazon
- History of Amazon
- Internal carbon pricing
- List of book distributors
- Statistically improbable phrases – Amazon.com's phrase extraction technique for indexing books
