= Amazon Academy =

Online learning platform

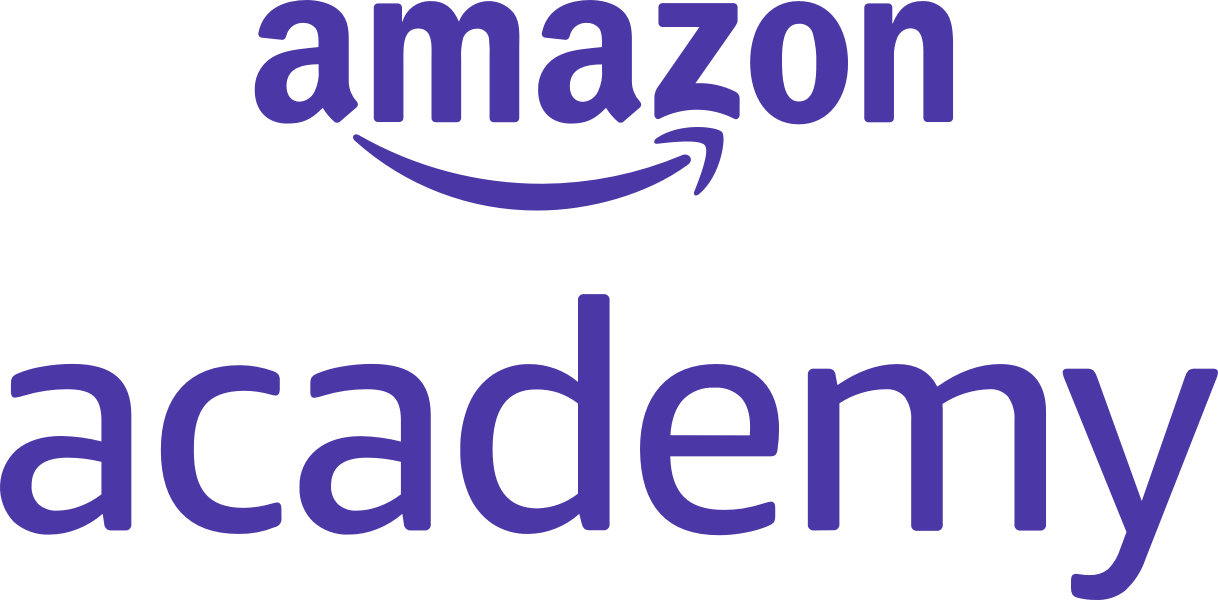
- Formerly: JEE Ready
- Industry: Education
- Founded: December 2019
- Key people: Amit Agarwal, Amol Gurwara (Director)
- Parent: Amazon.com, Inc.
- Website: https://academy.amazon.in/

Amazon Academy, formerly JEE Ready, is an online learning platform for engineering students to prepare for competitive exams like the Joint Entrance Examination (JEE), launched by Amazon India on 13 January 2021. It is currently available on Play Store or through the Web. It is available for free but it may introduce a pricing structure over time depending on the success of the platform.

Amazon Academy and educational group Sri Chaitanya have announced a collaboration to introduce full syllabus courses for joint entrance exam (JEE) and National Eligibility cum Entrance Test (NEET) preparation. The collaboration will enable the students to learn from each other and get access to learning modules, curated content and assessment material on Amazon Academy, according to the statement.

== See also ==
- Infinity Learn
- Education in India
