= Eero (wireless networking brand) =

Wireless mesh networking brand

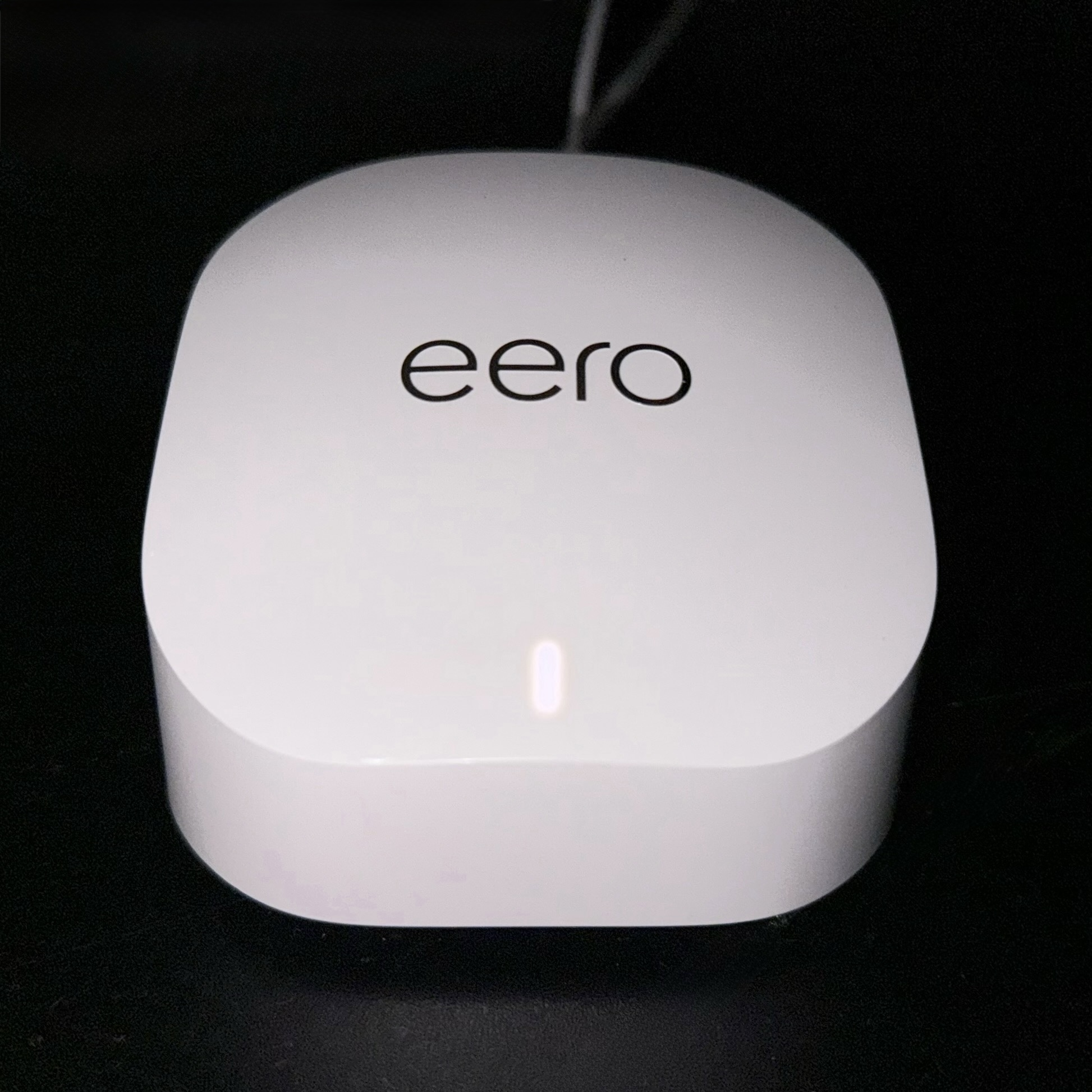
- An Eero 6+
- Manufacturer: Eero LLC
- Type: Router
- Released: First generation: February 23, 2016; 10 years ago (United States); Second generation: June 2017; 9 years ago (United States); Third generation: November 2020; 5 years ago (United States); Fourth generation: March 2022; 4 years ago (United States); Fifth generation: September 2023; 3 years ago (United States)
- Input: Eero App
- Website: eero.com

Eero (stylized as eero) is a line of wireless mesh networking systems developed by Eero LLC, a wholly owned subsidiary of Amazon. Eero aims to offer complete home Wi-Fi coverage through the use of multiple interconnected wireless nodes. Eero systems automatically route connected devices between nodes depending on signal strength. The first generation Eero router was released in February 2016, and since then, several generations have been released.

== History and name ==
The original Eero system was announced on February 23, 2016, and made available for purchase that same day.

The name Eero was chosen as a tribute to Finnish–American architect Eero Saarinen.

Amazon acquired Eero in 2019 for $97 million.

== Products ==
The first generation Eero router was pitched as the world's first home mesh Wi-Fi system. It featured 802.11ac (Wi-Fi 5) connectivity with 2.4 GHz and 5 GHz bands, 2x2 MIMO antennas, and beamforming support. Each first-generation Eero node offered a range of 1,000 square feet, and the nodes were designed to wirelessly connect to each other, forming an expandable mesh network capable of providing coverage to entire homes. The original Eero stopped receiving guaranteed feature and security updates on September 30, 2022, making it the only Eero model that doesn't receive guaranteed software updates.

In June 2017, Eero introduced the 2nd Generation Eero, which was later retroactively branded as Eero Pro (2nd Generation), along with the Eero Beacon. The Pro was a tri-band system with support for dedicated wireless backhaul, while the Beacon was a compact plug-in extender without Ethernet ports, designed to expand coverage within existing networks.

Following Amazon’s acquisition in 2019, the company launched a new dual-band system under the name Eero (2nd Generation). This model was positioned as a lower-cost alternative to the Pro line, with simplified hardware and fewer radio bands.

The Eero 6, Eero Pro 6, and Eero 6 Extender were announced in October 2020 and released the following month, marking the adoption of Wi-Fi 6 across the lineup. The Pro 6 added tri-band support and higher throughput, while the Extender was physically identical to the standard Eero 6 but lacked Ethernet ports and could not be used to start an Eero network, serving only to extend coverage.

In March 2022, Eero released the Eero 6+ and Eero Pro 6E. The Eero 6+ was a dual-band system that introduced 160 MHz channel support on the 5 GHz band, increasing available throughput compared to the Eero 6. The Pro 6E was a tri-band system that added compatibility with the 6 GHz band under Wi-Fi 6E.

The Eero PoE 6 and Eero PoE Gateway, released in September 2022, were designed for structured installations. The PoE 6 functioned as a ceiling or wall-mounted access point powered by Ethernet, while the Gateway acted as a central router with multiple wired ports.

In September 2023, the company introduced the Eero Max 7, its first Wi-Fi 7 system. It featured tri-band radios and multi-gigabit wired networking, including support for 10 Gb/s Ethernet.

In October 2024, Eero launched the Eero Outdoor 7, a weather-resistant Wi-Fi 7 access point intended for exterior installation, capable of extending coverage across large outdoor areas.

In February 2025, the company announced the Eero 7 and Eero Pro 7. The Eero 7 was a dual-band Wi-Fi 7 system, while the Pro 7 added tri-band capability and higher overall throughput.

At IFA 2025, Eero introduced the Eero PoE 7, continuing the PoE line with Wi-Fi 7 hardware and multi-gigabit backhaul. At the same event, the company announced Eero Signal, a USB-C cellular backup dongle with a built-in eSIM that provides failover connectivity. Eero Signal is available in both 4G LTE and 5G RedCap models; both require an annual Eero Plus subscription to enable cellular failover, which includes up to 10 GB of backup data per year. Eero also offers an Eero Plus 100 plan, which provides up to 100 GB per month of backup data. Eero PoE is slated for release in November 2025 in the US and Canada, while Eero Signal will be released in 2026.

== Software and services ==
=== eeroOS ===
Eero devices run eeroOS, the company's proprietary operating system. eeroOS regularly receives OTA updates, which, according to the company, typically include performance improvements, new features, and security enhancements. Users can manually update eeroOS from the Eero app, which is the sole method by which end users are able to set up, manage, and monitor Eero mesh Wi-Fi systems.

=== Eero app ===
The Eero app is a mobile application designed to facilitate the setup, management, and monitoring of Eero mesh Wi-Fi systems. It is available for iOS and Android devices. Features of the Eero app include guided network setup, real-time monitoring of the internet connection and Eero nodes, and the ability to add or remove devices to expand or modify the network as needed.

=== Eero Plus ===
Eero Plus (formerly known as Eero Secure) is a subscription service offered by Eero that provides additional networking and security features to subscribers' Eero networks.

== Eero for Service Providers ==
In November 2020, Eero began collaborating with internet service providers (ISPs) to integrate its mesh Wi-Fi systems into their service offerings. ISPs can deploy and manage Eero systems via Eero for Service Providers, a suite of hardware and software tools.

== Eero for Business ==
Eero for Business is a subscription service designed specifically for small businesses. It utilizes Eero's hardware with software features intended to meet business needs. It's designed to support businesses with up to 100 connected devices, up to 50 employees, and spaces up to 7,500 square feet.

== Hardware specifications ==
Model	Introduced	Wi-Fi (802.11) standard	Ethernet Ports	Memory		Range	Thread support	Matter support
Model	Introduced	Wi-Fi (802.11) standard	Ethernet Ports	RAM	Flash	Range	Thread support	Matter support
Gen1
Eero (1st generation)	February 2016	AC1300	Yes	512 MB	4 GB	1,000 sqft	No	No
Gen2
Eero Beacon	June 2017	AC1300	No	512 MB	4 GB	1,500 sqft	Yes	No
Eero Pro (2nd generation)	June 2017	AC2200	Yes	512 MB	4 GB	1,750 sqft	Yes	No
Eero (2nd generation)	September 2019	AC1300	Yes	512 MB	4 GB	1,500 sqft	No	No
Gen3
Eero 6	November 2020	AX1800	Yes	512 MB	4 GB	1,500 sqft	Yes	Yes
Eero 6 Extender	November 2020	AX1800	No	512 MB	4 GB	1,500 sqft	Yes	Yes
Eero Pro 6	November 2020	AX4200	Yes	1 GB	4 GB	2,000 sqft	Yes	Yes
Gen3e
Eero 6+	March 2022	AX3000	Yes	512 MB	4 GB	1,500 sqft	Yes	Yes
Eero Pro 6E	March 2022	AX5400	Yes	1 GB	4 GB	2,000 sqft	Yes	Yes
Eero PoE 6	September 2022	AX3000	Yes	512 MB	4 GB	2,000 sqft	Yes	Yes
Gen5
Eero PoE Gateway	July 2023	—N/a	Yes	2 GB	4 GB	—N/a	Yes	Yes
Eero Max 7	September 2023	BE20800	Yes	2 GB	4 GB	2,500 sqft	Yes	Yes
Eero Outdoor 7	October 2024	BE5000	Yes	1 GB	4 GB	15,000 sqft	Yes	Yes
Eero 7	February 2025	BE5000	Yes	1 GB	4 GB	2,000 sqft	Yes	Yes
Eero Pro 7	February 2025	BE10800	Yes	1 GB	4 GB	2,000 sqft	Yes	Yes

== Reception ==
Media websites such as CNET and The Verge praised Eero's hardware design, ease of use, and Amazon Alexa integration, but criticized its price, missing specialized network features, and the decision to require users to subscribe to Eero Plus to access advanced features.
