= Amazon Storywriter =

Cloud-based screenwriting app by Amazon

Amazon Storywriter was a free cloud-based screenwriting app launched by Amazon in 2015. Storywriter provided automatic formatting for screenplays on the Master Scene Standard. The app allowed original screenplays to be submitted to Amazon Studios for production consideration until April 2018 when submissions were closed.

In May 2019, Amazon Studios announced Amazon Storywriter and Storybuilder were to be discontinued on June 30, 2019 with accounts disabled and any content not downloaded becoming inaccessible. Attempting to access Amazon Storywriter after the discontinue date will redirect the user to Amazon Studios' website.

== Reception ==
The product was understood to have ease of use and a gentle learning curve, but was not a replacement for products such as Final Draft or WriterDuet which have import and export facilities.
