= Amazon Pharmacy =

American online pharmacy

- Company type: Subsidiary
- Industry: Pharmaceutical
- Founded: November 17, 2020; 5 years ago
- Area served: United States
- Services: Online pharmacy
- Parent: Amazon
- Website: pharmacy.amazon.com

Amazon Pharmacy is an American online pharmacy which is a subsidiary of Amazon. The business was launched on November 17, 2020, initially offering pharmacy service only in the United States.

== Launch and business model ==
On November 17, 2020, Amazon launched Amazon Pharmacy. The move was described as "arguably Amazon’s broadest push into the healthcare business to-date."

Amazon Pharmacy's business is based on sales. The company offers free, two-day home delivery of prescriptions to Amazon Prime subscribers. Amazon Pharmacy requires customers to establish a secure pharmacy profile to manage insurance and medical information. At the time of its formation, Amazon Pharmacy's operation was limited to the United States. At the time of its launch, Amazon Pharmacy also announced its intention to offer a help line staffed by pharmacists and a discount program for uninsured customers.

Challenges faced by Amazon Pharmacy include the need for customers to ask doctors to redirect prescriptions, customer habit in using nearby brick-and-mortar drug stores, and customer desire to speak in person with a pharmacist.

In October 2025 Amazon Pharmacy announced the launch of vending machines that dispense prescription medications, expanding its healthcare services beyond online delivery. The machines allow customers to verify their identity, consult with pharmacists virtually, and collect common prescriptions in select U.S cities. These vending machines can be found at One Medical clinics in Los Angeles.

== Impact on existing pharmacies ==
The formation of Amazon Pharmacy was expected to result in disruption of the retail pharmacy sector. On the day of its launch, stock prices for competitors dropped: GoodRx by 20%; Rite Aid by 16%; and Walgreens and CVS Pharmacy by 9% each. In all, drugstores, drug distributors, and health insurers lost $22 billion in market value on the day of Amazon Pharmacy's launch.

An analysis from Citi Research called the announcement "a disruption to the system and competitive threat that will likely shift scripts away from the retail channel." An Edwards Jones analyst opined that Amazon Pharmacy was a particular threat to smaller drugstores that lack the purchasing power of major drugstore chains.

Some employers, such as 7-Eleven, began only paying for prescriptions through Amazon Pharmacy following its launch through their health insurance plan.

== Relationship to PillPack ==
The establishment of Amazon Pharmacy followed Amazon's acquisition of PillPack in June 2018 for a reported US$753 million. In an interim step, Amazon rebranded PillPack in November 2019 as "PillPack, by Amazon Pharmacy". With the launch of Amazon Pharmacy, the company announced that PillPack would continue to operate as a "distinct service for customers managing multiple daily medications for chronic conditions."
