= Camelcamelcamel =

Amazon price-tracking website

CamelCamelCamel
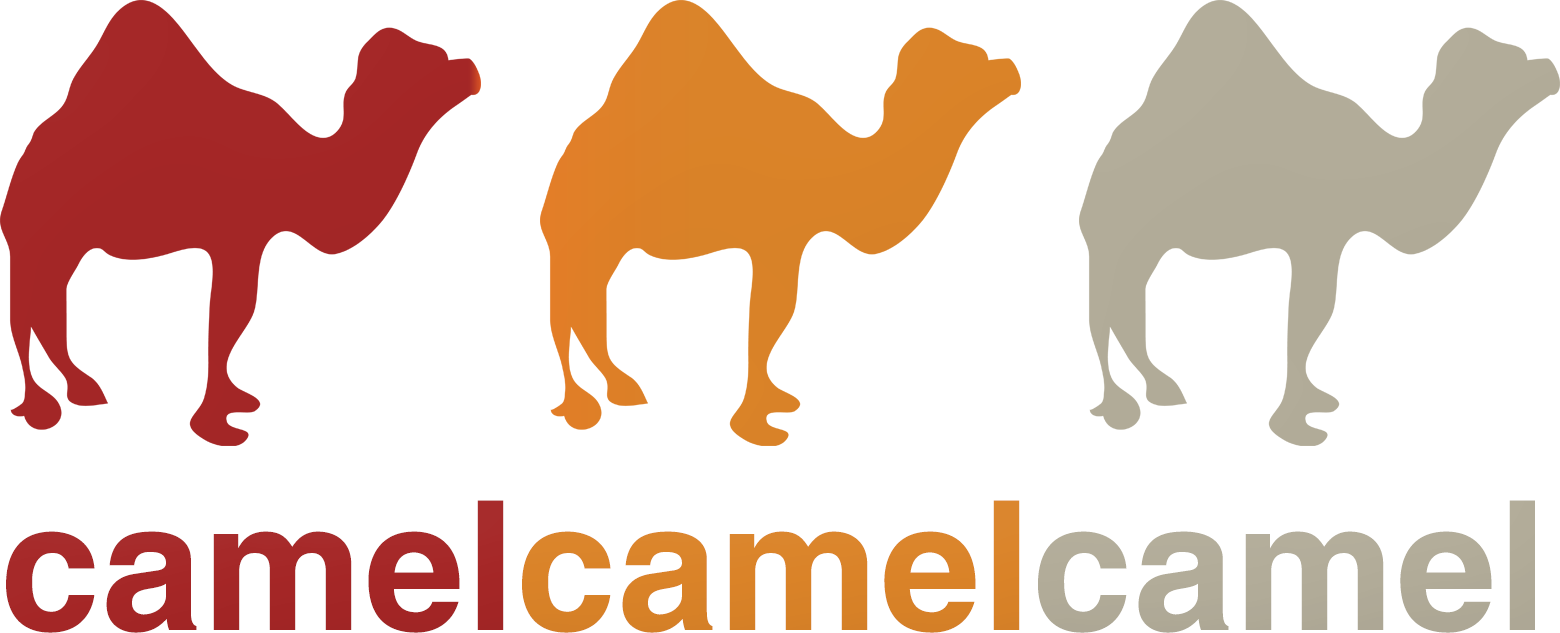

- Available in: English, Spanish, French, German, Italian
- Area served: Australia, Canada, France, Germany, Italy, Spain, United Kingdom, United States
- Founder: Daniel Green
- Website: camelcamelcamel.com
- Launched: 2008; 18 years ago

Camelcamelcamel is a website that tracks prices of products sold on Amazon. It was founded by Daniel Green in 2008 and developed by Cosmic Shovel Inc.

In 2015 it was voted as the most popular price tracking tool among Lifehacker readers.

Due to a failure of three hard drives on the database server on January 26, 2019, the service was unavailable for several days. The service itself listed a breakdown of the costs needed to recover the service.

During the COVID-19 pandemic they agreed to Amazon's request to stop tracking prices in select regions.

According to Cosmic Shovel Inc., the overall maintenance of camelcamelcamel amounts to about $11,000 per month.
