= Amazon Astro =

Brand of domestic robots from Amazon

Astro
- Manufacturer: Amazon
- Inventor: Amazon
- Country: U.S.
- Year of creation: 2021
- Price: US$1,599; by invitation only
- Type: Domestic robot
- Purpose: Home monitoring, virtual assistant

Amazon Astro is a home robot developed by Amazon.com, Inc. It was designed for home security monitoring, remote care of elderly relatives, and as a virtual assistant that can follow a person from room to room.

== Features ==
Tom's Guide called the device "Alexa on wheels" and everything available on the Amazon Echo Show 10 is on this new device. The Astro has visual ID and should be able to recognize different family members and send an alert if the device sees someone it does not recognize in the home.

In 2022, Amazon announced a pilot program connecting Astro to the Ring security system, allowing workers in a remote call centre to control Astro to investigate security alerts.

== Hardware ==
Processors	2× Qualcomm QCS605; 1× Qualcomm SDA660; 1× Amazon AZ1 Neural Edge
Display	10.1-inch touchscreen, 1280 × 800 resolution
Cameras	1× 5MP bezel camera; 1× 1080p periscope camera with 132° diagonal field of view; vision in both visible and infrared light
Speakers	2× 55 mm front-firing speakers, 1× passive bass radiator
Battery	Lithium-ion
Connectivity	USB-C; WiFi 802.11ac; Bluetooth
Dimensions	16.7 in. L × 9.8 in. W × 17.3 in. H (424 mm × 250 mm × 440 mm)
Weight	20.6 lbs (9.35 kg)

== Reception ==
Mark Gurman of Bloomberg News says that, six months after its release, hardly anyone was talking about Astro online, and that Amazon had shipped only a few hundred units, at most. David Priest of CNET observes that "For now, this robot remains a luxury item, for people with a lot of money to try out a cutting-edge technology that still lacks a compelling use case." Lauren Goode of Wired magazine labels Astro as "a robot for the sake of a robot" and "a robot without a cause, at least for now".

The announcement in September 2022 that Astro would function as a security guard connected to Ring security devices for homes and small businesses led Gizmodo to comment on the increasing "creepiness" of Astro.

== See also ==
- Smart speaker
