= RR Haywood =

British author

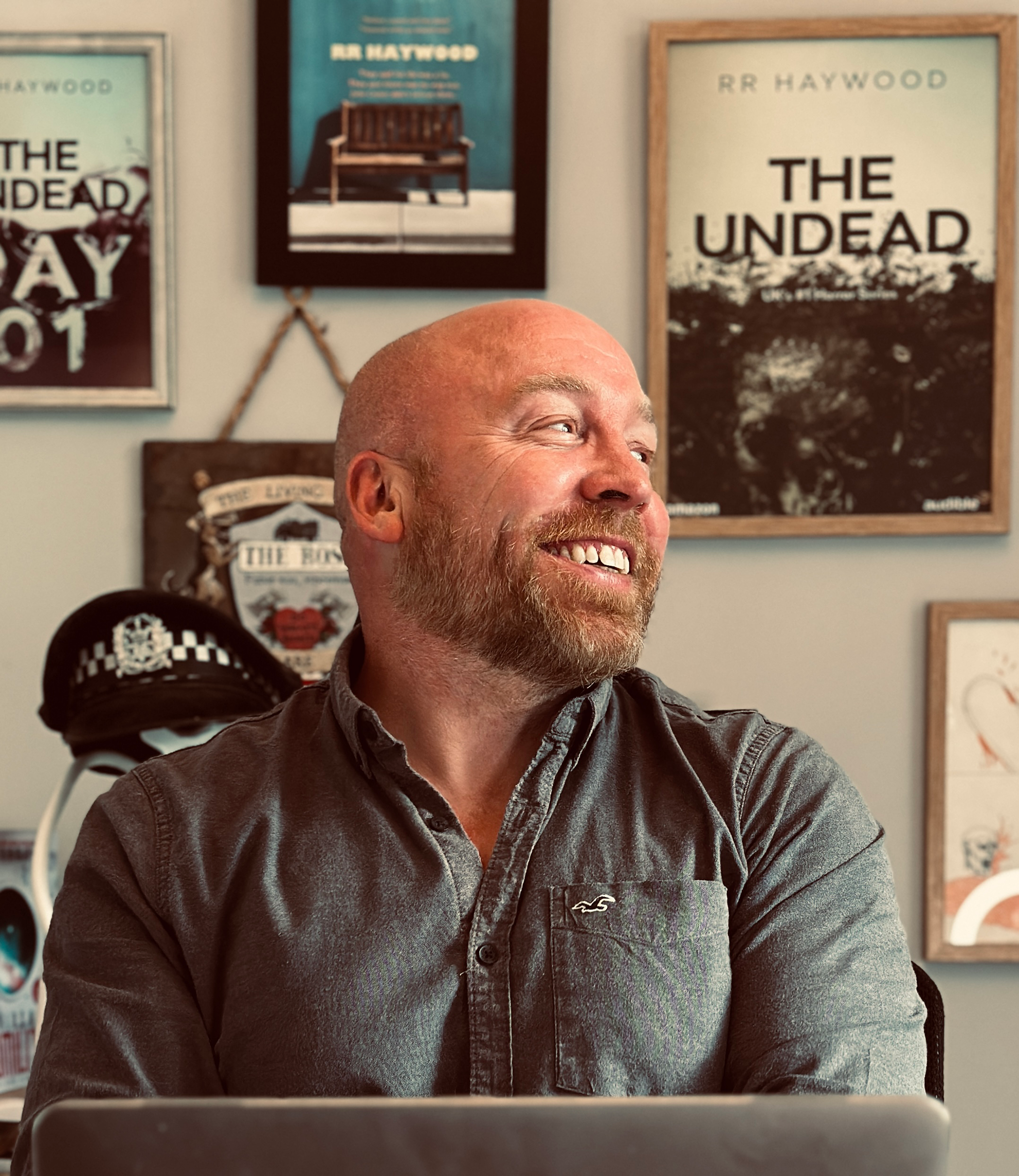
- Author RR Haywood
- Occupation: Author
- Writing career
- Genres: Horror, science fiction, thriller, action
- Website: rrhaywood.com

Richard Haywood (born 17 May 1975), who writes under the pen name RR Haywood, is one of the UK's bestselling self-published authors.

Most known for the Undead series of post-apocalyptic zombie novels, Haywood has published more than 40 books and is a Wall Street Journal, Washington Post, Amazon, and Audible multiple bestselling author with 25 Kindle and Audible bestsellers and nearly four million copies sold worldwide.

His writing spans multiple genres including horror (The Undead), science fiction (the Extracted Trilogy, the DELIO trilogy), thrillers (A Town Called Discovery), and satirical action-adventure (Fiction Land). Haywood's style is marked by a focus on characterisation and gritty realism.

== Life and career ==
Growing up in Birmingham, England, Haywood was a voracious reader from a young age, finding solace in books during what he describes as a "disjointed childhood". He moved with his family to the Isle of Wight aged eight, where he still resides. His favourite authors growing up included J. R. R. Tolkien, Isaac Asimov, and Arthur C. Clarke.

Prior to becoming a full-time author, Haywood was a policeman, joining Hampshire Police in 1998 and being posted to the Isle of Wight, where he was the island's highest arresting officer with an average of 150 arrests per year. Thanks to the success of his writing career, he was able to retire from policing in 2017 after 19 years’ service.

His first book, the novella The Undead Day One, was self-published in 2012. He was inspired to release it after reading the self-released novel Three Feet of Sky by Stephen Ayres. His original intention with his first few books, comprising The Undead Day One to The Undead Day Seven, was to teach himself to write, with each new entry to the series introducing another core element of writing, such as multiple character points of view and scene building. Haywood has readily admitted that these first few releases "were awful" on account of "being full of typos and other elementary errors which have, thankfully, since been corrected".

In 2014, he signed with British literary agency Hardman & Swainson after visiting several agencies around London with a mobile billboard advertising van promoting his books. The increasing popularity of the Undead series secured Haywood a three-book deal with 47North, the publishing imprint of Amazon Publishing. Through 47North, he released time-travel series the Extracted trilogy, which became a Washington Post and Wall Street Journal bestseller, as well as a number one bestseller on Amazon US and Amazon UK.

As of 2023, he has written 25 books in the Undead series. His other works include science-fiction trilogies DELIO (with the first book in the series, DELIO. Phase One, winning the Discover Sci-Fi 2023 Readers’ Choice Award) and The Code, the latter being one of the first Audible Original science-fiction series with Audible UK, narrated by actor Colin Morgan. His latest novel, Fiction Land, was released in November 2023 and has also proven a bestseller, with the audiobook version, narrated by former Game of Thrones star Gethin Anthony, topping the Audible pre-order charts in the weeks prior to release.

Haywood continues to self-publish certain books, such as the Undead series, under the 1899 Inc imprint, saying that he likes the "creative freedom it provides, as well as the immediacy it brings, connecting me with readers in a way that’s much more difficult when an author is 100 per cent traditionally published". He is a vocal critic of creative writing courses, which he says "kill creativity". He states that the only rule aspiring authors should follow is to read widely, suggesting they read 1,000 books before writing their first book.
