= List of Amazon products and services =

This is a list of products and services offered by American corporation Amazon.

== Retail goods ==
Amazon product lines include (books, music CDs, videotapes, and software), apparel, baby products, consumer electronics, beauty products, gourmet food, groceries, health and personal care items, industrial and scientific supplies, kitchen items, jewellery and watches, lawn and garden items, musical instruments, sporting goods, tools, automotive items and toys/games. It contains 350 million products.

The company launched amazon.com Auctions, a web auction service, in March 1999. However, it failed to chip away at the large market share of the industry pioneer, eBay. Later, the company launched a fixed-price marketplace business, zShops, in September 1999, and the now defunct partnership with Sotheby's, called Sothebys.amazon.com, in November. Auctions and zShops evolved into Amazon Marketplace, a service launched in November 2000 that let customers sell used books, CDs, DVDs, and other products alongside new items. As of October 2014, Amazon Marketplace is the largest of its kind, followed by similar marketplaces from Sears, Rakuten, and Newegg.

In August 2007, Amazon announced AmazonFresh, a grocery service offering perishable and nonperishable foods. Customers could have orders delivered to their homes at dawn or during a specified daytime window. Delivery was initially restricted to residents of Mercer Island, Washington, and was later expanded to several ZIP codes in Seattle proper. AmazonFresh also operated pick-up locations in the suburbs of Bellevue and Kirkland from summer 2007 through early 2008.

In 2012, Amazon announced the launch of Vine.com for buying green products, including groceries, household items, and apparel. It is part of Quidsi, the company that Amazon bought in 2010 that also runs the sites Diapers.com (baby), Wag.com (pets), and YoYo.com (toys). Amazon also owns other e-commerce sites like Shopbop.com, Woot.com, and Zappos.com.

Amazon's Subscribe & Save program offers a discounted price on selected items (usually ones often reordered), free standard shipping on every Subscribe & Save shipment (starting from the second order), and automatic shipment of the item every two to six weeks or one to six months.

In 2013, Amazon launched its site in India, Amazon. in. It started with electronic goods. In July 2014, Amazon said it would invest $2 billion (Rs 12,000 crore) in India to expand the business after its largest Indian rival Flipkart announced $1 billion in funding.

In 2014, Amazon sold 63% of all books bought online and 40% of all books sold overall.

In 2015, a study by Survata found that 44% of respondents searching for products went directly to Amazon.com.

On September 30, 2015, Amazon announced the launch of Merch by Amazon, a service intended to help content creators generate revenue through the sale of branded T-shirts and other merchandise items such as long sleeve shirts, sweatshirts, hoodies and PopSockets grips, designed by creators and sold, produced and fulfilled by Amazon. Since the summer of 2018, the service has also been available on the European marketplaces in Germany and Great Britain. In June 2022, the service was renamed Amazon Merch on Demand.

In October 2015, Amazon announced a new handmade marketplace called Handmade By Amazon, which already has 5,000 sellers from 60 countries and 80,000 items for sale. The platform is designed for artisans to sell their goods directly to the public, similar to the platform Etsy.

In September 2020, Amazon launched Luxury Stores on its mobile app, where Oscar de la Renta became the first and only label to partner with the firm.

== Amazon Prime ==

In 2005, Amazon announced the creation of Amazon Prime, a membership offering free two-day shipping within the contiguous United States on all eligible purchases for a flat annual fee of $79 (equivalent to $130 in 2025), as well as discounted one-day shipping rates. Amazon launched the program in Germany, Japan, and the United Kingdom in 2007; in France (as "Amazon Premium") in 2008, in Italy in 2011, in Canada in 2013, and in India on July 26, 2016.

Amazon Prime membership in Germany, the United Kingdom, Canada, India, and the United States also provides Amazon Video, the instant streaming of selected movies and TV shows at no additional cost. In November 2011, it was announced that Prime members have access to the Kindle Owners’ Lending Library, which allows users to borrow certain popular Kindle e-books for free reading on Kindle hardware, up to one book a month, with no due date.

In March 2014, Amazon announced an increase in the annual membership fee for Amazon Prime, from $79 to $99 for customers in the United States. Shortly after this change, Amazon announced Prime Music, a service in which members can get unlimited, ad-free streaming of over a million songs and access to curated playlists. In November 2014, Amazon added Prime Photos, which allows unlimited photo storage in the users' Amazon Drive. Amazon also began offering free same-day delivery to Prime members in 14 United States metropolitan areas in May 2015.

On July 15, 2015, to commemorate its 20th birthday, Amazon celebrated "Amazon Prime Day", which Amazon announced would feature deals for prime members that rivaled those on Black Friday.

In January 2016, Amazon Prime reached 54 million members according to a report from Consumer Intelligence Research Partners.

On September 30, 2016, Amazon subsidiary Twitch announced premium features that are exclusive to users who have an active Amazon Prime subscription (Twitch Prime), including advertising-free access to the service, and monthly offers of video games and add-on content.

In December 2016, Amazon began offering the option of monthly payment for Prime memberships.

== Consumer electronics ==
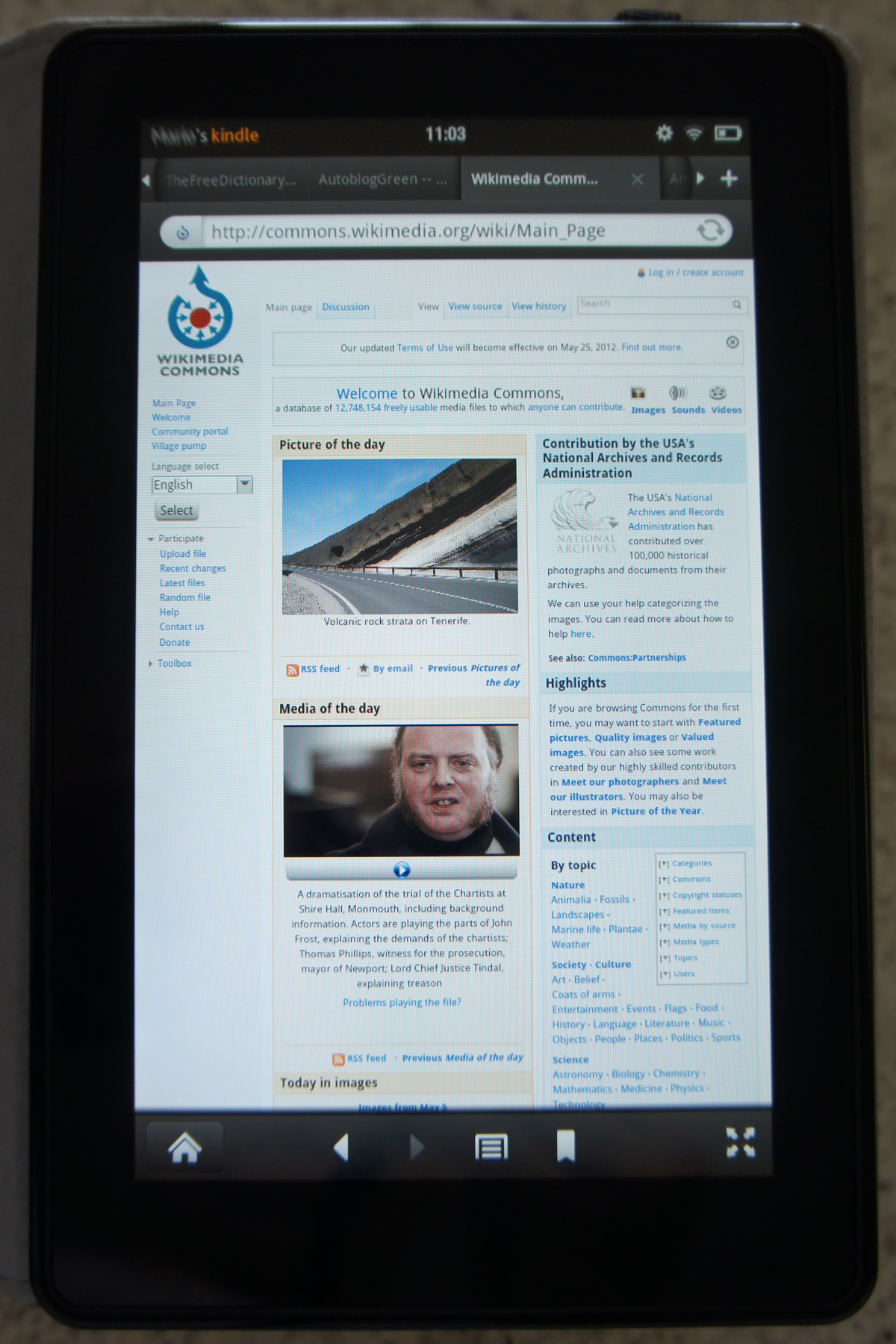
A Kindle Fire

In November 2007, Amazon launched the Kindle, an e-reader which downloads content over "Whispernet", via Sprint's EV-DO wireless network. The screen uses E Ink technology to reduce battery consumption and to provide a more legible display. As of July 2014, there are over 2.7 million e-books available for purchase at the Kindle Store. Starting in 2012 Amazon began offering differing models within generations of its readers starting with the Paperwhite, Voyage, and most recently the Oasis 2 released in October 2017.

In September 2011, Amazon announced its entry into the tablet computer market by introducing the Kindle Fire, which runs a customized fork of the Android operating system. The low pricing of Fire (US$199) was widely perceived as a strategy backed by Amazon's revenue from its content sales, to be stimulated by access to Fire tablets.

In September 2012, Amazon unveiled the second generation tablet, called the Kindle Fire HD. On September 25, 2013, Amazon.com unveiled its third generation tablet, called the Kindle Fire HDX.

In April 2014, Amazon announced its Amazon Fire TV set-top box system, a device targeted to compete with such systems as Apple TV or Google's Chromecast device. The Amazon set-top box allows for streaming videos from sites like Amazon's own streaming service as well as others such as Netflix or Hulu. The device also supports voice search for movies, as well as gaming, which includes special versions of Minecraft, Asphalt 8, and The Walking Dead. Amazon announced the Fire TV Stick in October 2014. The device replicates much of the functionality of the Fire TV.

The company entered the smartphone market in July 2014 with the release of the Fire Phone. Due to poor sales and reception, Amazon discontinued it in August 2015.

In 2014, Amazon sold a voice-enabled smart speaker called Echo. In March 2016, Amazon launched the Amazon Echo Dot, a smaller, more affordable version of the Echo.

== Digital content ==
Amazon's Honor System was launched in 2001 to allow customers to make donations or buy digital content, with Amazon collecting a percentage of the payment plus a fee; however, the service was discontinued in 2008 and replaced by Amazon Payments.

On September 25, 2007, Amazon Music, an online music store, was launched as Amazon MP3 in the US selling downloads exclusively in MP3 format without digital rights management. (In addition to copyright law, Amazon's terms of use agreements restrict use of the MP3s, but Amazon does not use digital rights management (DRM) to enforce those terms.) In addition to independent music labels, Amazon MP3 primarily sells music from the "Big 4" record labels: EMI, Universal, Warner Bros. Records, and Sony Music. Before the launch of this service, Amazon invested in Amie Street, a music store with a variable pricing model based on demand. Amazon MP3 was the first online offering of DRM-free music from all four major record companies.

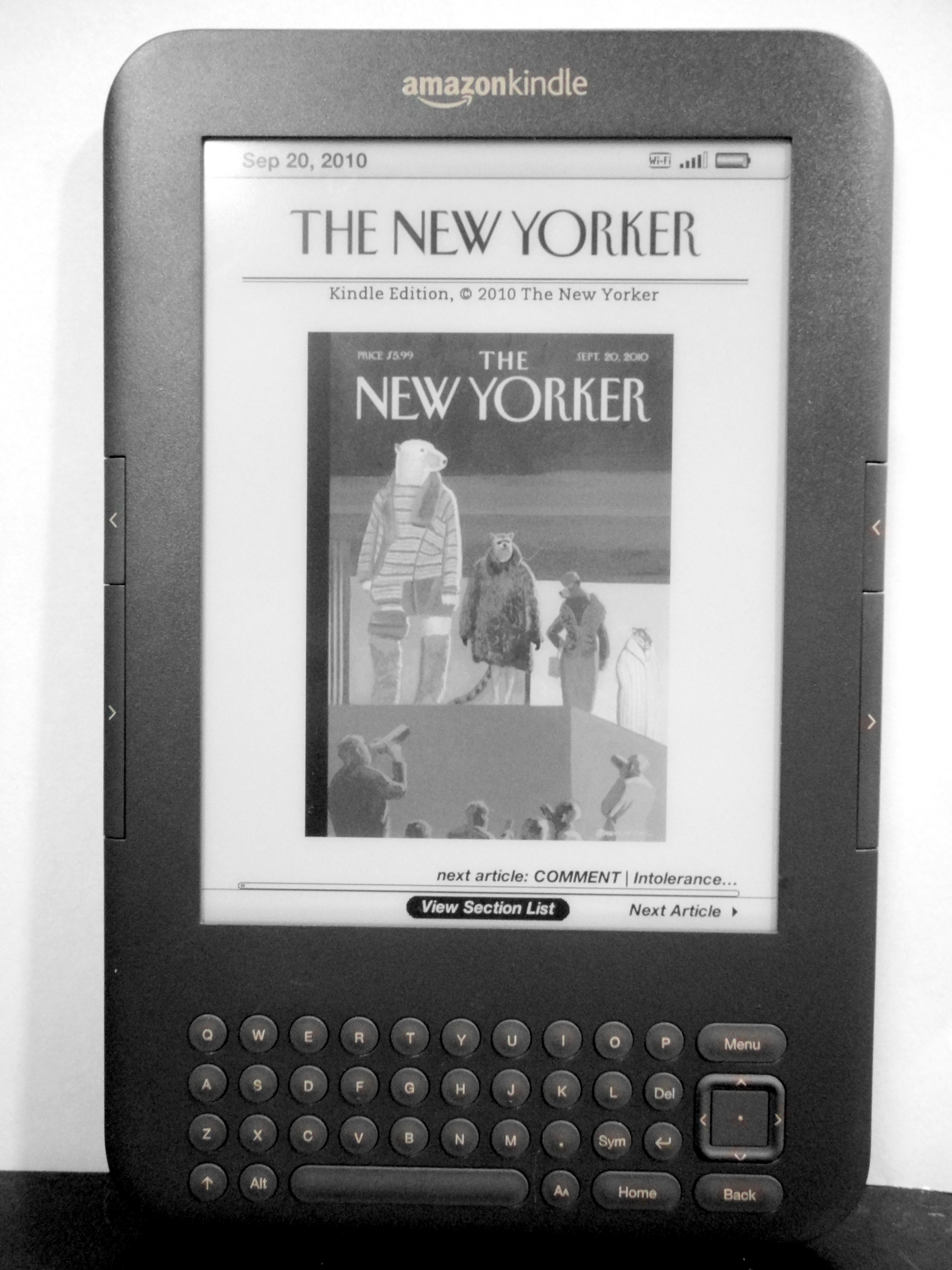
The New Yorker on a Kindle Keyboard

In November 2007, the Kindle Store was launched as an e-book e-commerce store and can be accessed from any Amazon Kindle, Fire tablet or Kindle mobile app. At its launch, the store had more than 88,000 digital titles available. This number increased to more than 765,000 by August 2011 and as of January 2017 there were over five million e-books available in the U.S.

In January 2008, Amazon began distributing its MP3 service to subsidiary websites worldwide and, in December 2008, Amazon MP3 was made available in the UK. At the launch of Amazon MP3 in the UK, over 3 million Digital Rights Management (DRM)-free songs were made available to consumers, with prices that started at 59p, compared to Apple's 79p starting price.

In July 2010, Amazon announced that e-book sales for its Kindle reader outnumbered sales of hardcover books for the first time during the second quarter of 2010. Amazon claims that, during that period, 143 e-books were sold for every 100 hardcover books, including hardcovers for which there is no digital edition; and during late June and early July, sales rose to 180 digital books for every 100 hardcovers.

On March 22, 2011, Amazon launched the Amazon Appstore for Android devices and the service was made available in over 200 countries. Also in 2011, Amazon announced that it was releasing a Mac download store to offer dozens of games and hundreds of pieces of software for Apple computers.

In January 2013, Amazon launched AutoRip, a digital music service. The service allows customers to receive a free MP3 copy of select CDs purchased through Amazon. Amazon announced in September 2013 that it would launch Kindle MatchBook in October 2013, a similar service for books allowing customers who buy books from Amazon to acquire an e-book copy for free, or at a discounted price of US$3 or less. MatchBook was launched on the company's site on October 29, 2013.

In October 2016, Amazon Music released a music streaming service called "Amazon Music Unlimited". Unlike Prime Music with its somewhat limited catalog, this stand-alone music streaming service has "tens of millions" of songs and is intended to compete with music streaming leaders such as Spotify and Pandora Radio. It has a similar price structure, albeit with a $2/month discount for Amazon Prime members.

=== Amazon Studios ===
Amazon Studios is a corporate division that develops television shows, movies, and comics from online submissions and crowd-sourced feedback. It was started in late 2010. Content would be distributed through Amazon Video, Amazon's digital video streaming service, and a competitor to services like Netflix and Hulu. For films, Warner Bros. is a partner.

=== Amazon Games Studios ===
In October 2008, Amazon acquired game developer and distributor Reflexive Entertainment. This studio continued to develop games for PC, Mac and Kindle eReaders under the brands Reflexive and Amazon Digital Services. Notable titles include Every Word for Kindle Paperwhite and Airport Mania for Kindle Fire, Android, iOS, Windows, and Mac.

In August 2012, Amazon announced it would be adding a gaming department to its company titled Amazon Game Studios. Amazon stated that it would introduce "innovative, fun, and well-crafted games" to consumers. According to the Amazon Game Studios website, the last game that was launched by the department was Amazon's first ever mobile game Air Patriots, released on November 1, 2012.

On February 6, 2014, Amazon confirmed the acquisition of the gaming company Double Helix Games without any indication of the financial terms. The 75 Double Helix employees were to become Amazon employees and their Orange County, California, headquarters was to remain their operating base. Amazon informed the TechCrunch media company that it "acquired Double Helix as part of our [Amazon's] ongoing commitment to build innovative games for customers" and confirmed that Double Helix's current game roster and other future developments will receive support following the acquisition.

On August 25, 2014, Amazon announced its intent to acquire the video game streaming website Twitch for $970 million. The acquisition of Twitch is expected to help Amazon drive Internet traffic and potentially boost its Prime membership program, and promote its video ad and Fire TV set top box business.

=== Amazon Luna ===
On September 24, 2020, Amazon announced Amazon Luna, a cloud gaming service with an initial library of around 100 titles.

=== Advertising ===
In 2024, advertising accounted for $56 billion in revenue which was the third largest globally. Amazon's advertising business, known as Amazon Ads, had an estimated value of $125 billion in 2019. In 2023, Amazon expanded Amazon Sponsored Products to make the ads show on third-party sites such as Pinterest, BuzzFeed, Hearst Newspapers, Raptive and Ziff Davis brands like Mashable and Lifehacker instead of just Amazon properties.

== Amazon Prime Video ==
Amazon Prime Video, also known as Prime Video and formerly Amazon Video and Prime Instant Video, is an online video-on-demand service by Amazon currently available worldwide except in Crimea, Russia, China, Iran, Syria, and Iraq. In 2015, the Prime Instant Video-exclusive series, Transparent earned two Golden Globe Awards, making it the first series from a streaming service to win a Golden Globe for best series.

=== Video Direct ===
On May 10, 2016, Amazon launched a Video Service called Amazon Video Direct which allows users to place videos available to rent or own, to view free with ads, or to be bundled together, and offered as an ad-on subscription. Amazon pays creators 50% of the revenue earned from rental or sale of the videos, but for ad-supported videos, the makers will get a portion of ad receipts.

== Delivery ==
To reduce costs, Amazon has been shifting away from traditional shipping providers for last mile delivery. The company owns over 30,000 delivery vans, which are sublet to small companies, who choose to work exclusively with the company under its Amazon Logistics program. In 2019, 100,000 electric delivery vans were ordered by Amazon, to be delivered between 2021 and 2030. For its one and two-hour service, Prime Now, Amazon distributes routes to independent contractors through its Flex app. Flex contractors are paid based on how long Amazon believes the delivery route will take, and use their vehicle to make these deliveries. Six-wheeled "Scout" sidewalk delivery robots and drones under the Prime Air moniker are currently under development. Amazon also directly contracts freight shipments between its warehouses by truck and through Amazon Air.

=== Groceries ===
Amazon Fresh is a home grocery delivery service first trialed in 2007, and later made available in Boston, Seattle, Los Angeles, San Francisco, California, San Diego, Brooklyn, New York, and Philadelphia. In 2017, Amazon purchased Whole Foods and began selling 365 branded products through Amazon Fresh.

Amazon Prime Pantry is a similar service covering the 48 contiguous United States, allowing the order of up to 45 pounds of dry goods and non-perishable groceries for a flat delivery fee.

== Amazon Business ==
Amazon Supply, launched in 2012, offers industrial and scientific components and maintenance, repair and operations (MRO) supplies. Amazon Supply was developed based on experience operating Smallparts.com, acquired in 2005. On April 28, 2015, the limited-scope service was replaced with Amazon Business. Amazon Business is a service that provides registered business owners with a consolidated platform for buying products and supplies from Amazon. Business users have access to shipping benefits, discounts on eligible products, purchase analytics, and price comparisons from different sellers.

== Amazon Drive ==
Amazon Drive, formerly known as Cloud Drive, is a cloud storage application offering secure cloud storage, file synchronization, file sharing, and Photo printing. Using an Amazon account, the files and folders can be transferred and managed from multiple devices including web browsers, desktop applications, mobiles, and tablets. Amazon Drive also lets their U.S. users order photo prints and photo books using Amazon Prints service.

Amazon Photos is a related service geared toward storing, organizing, and sharing photos and videos. Prime users get free unlimited storage for photos in their original format, including some RAW files. Videos, and photos for non-Prime users, take up space in Drive.

== Private labels and exclusive marketing arrangements ==
In August 2005, Amazon began selling products under its own private label, "Pinzon"; the trademark applications indicated that the label would be used for textiles, kitchen utensils, and other household goods. In March 2007, the company applied to expand the trademark to cover a more diverse list of goods and to register a new design consisting of the "word PINZON in stylized letters with a notched letter "O" which appears at the "one o'clock" position". Coverage by the trademark grew to include items such as paints, carpets, wallpaper, hair accessories, clothing, footwear, headgear, cleaning products, and jewelry. In September 2008, Amazon filed to have the name registered. USPTO has finished its review of the application, but Amazon has yet to receive an official registration for the name.

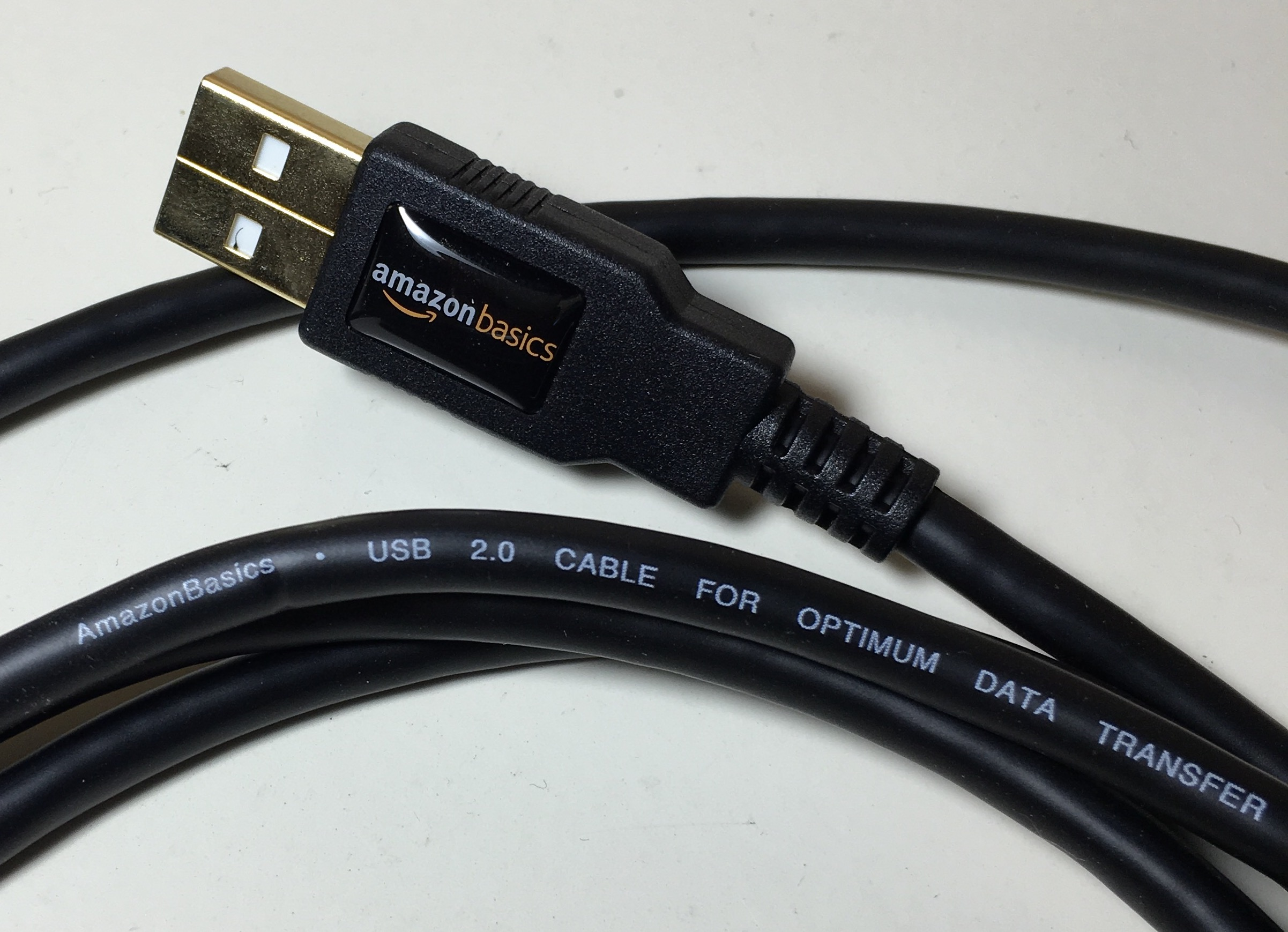
AmazonBasics branded USB cable

AmazonBasics is a private-label product line, mainly consisting of consumer electronics accessories, but also including home and office accessories. The line was launched in 2009.

In 2014, Amazon launched Amazon Elements, a line of domestic products including baby wipes and (formerly) diapers.

In early 2017, Amazon launched a line of snack foods under the name Wickedly Prime. The products, such as chips and cookies are only available to Amazon Prime members.

An Amazon.com exclusive is a product, that is available exclusively on Amazon.com. Some DVDs are produced by the owner of the film or product, while others are produced by Amazon.com itself. The DVDs produced by Amazon are made using its "CreateSpace" program, in which DVDs are created, upon ordering, using DVD-R technology. The DVDs are then shipped about two days later. Some DVDs (such as the Jersey Shore Season 1 or The Unusuals Season 1) are released first as an Amazon.com exclusive for a limited time before being released elsewhere. On May 23, 2011, Amazon.com allowed customers to download Lady Gaga's Born This Way album for 99 cents, resulting in some downloads being delayed, due to an extremely high volume of downloads.

== Amazon Web Services ==
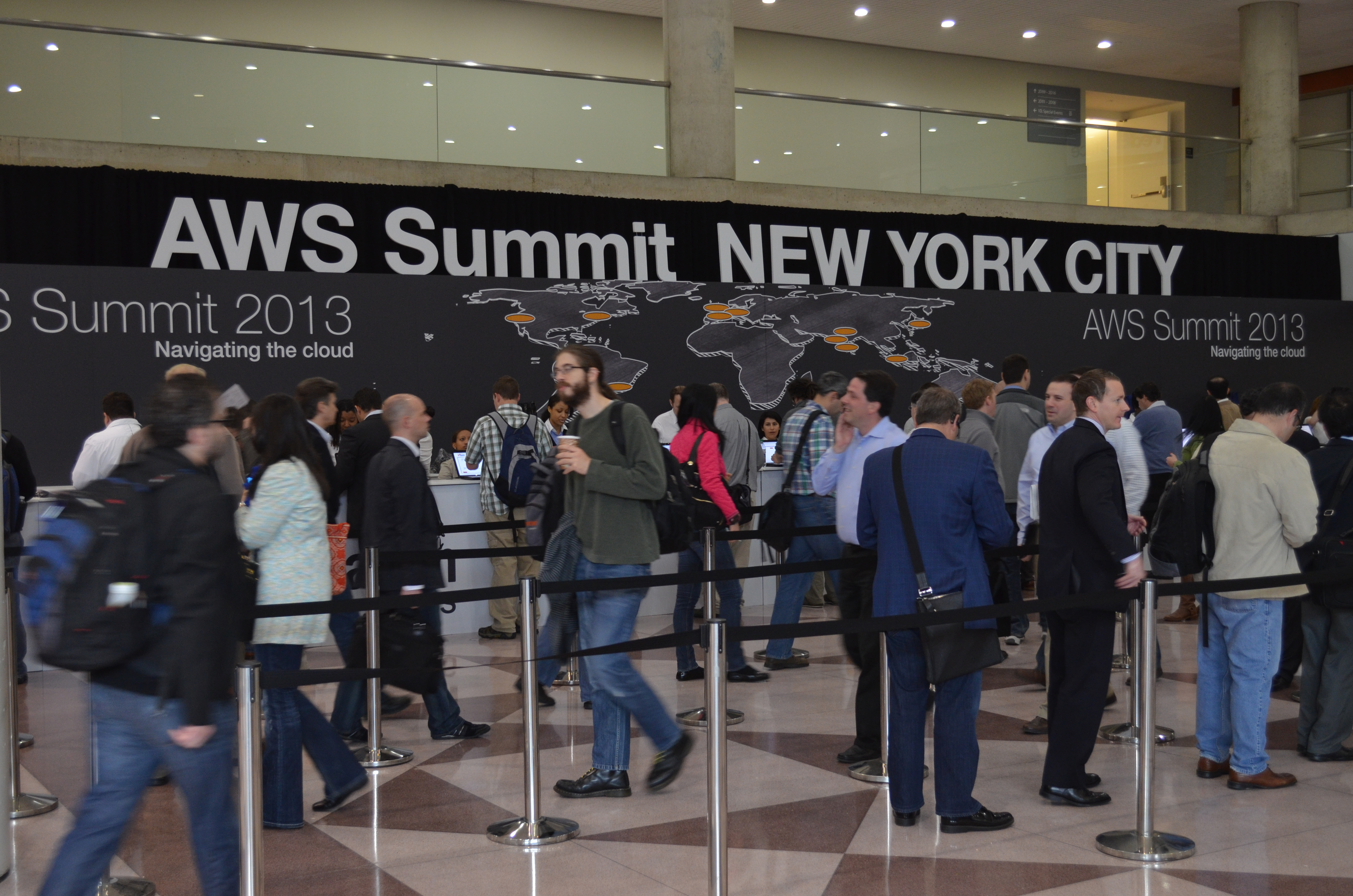
AWS Summit 2013 event in New York City

Amazon launched Amazon Web Services (AWS) in 2002, which provides programmatic access to latent features on its website.

In November 2005, Amazon began testing Amazon Mechanical Turk, an application programming interface (API) allowing programs to dispatch tasks to human processors.

In March 2006, Amazon launched an online storage service called Amazon Simple Storage Service (Amazon S3). An unlimited number of data objects, from 1 byte to 5 terabytes in size, can be stored in S3 and distributed via HTTP or BitTorrent. The service charges monthly fees for data stored and transferred. In 2006, Amazon introduced Amazon Simple Queue Service (Amazon SQS), a distributed queue messaging service, and product wikis (later folded into Amapedia) and discussion forums for certain products using guidelines that follow standard message board conventions.

Also in 2006, Amazon introduced Amazon Elastic Compute Cloud (Amazon EC2), a virtual site farm, allowing users to use the Amazon infrastructure to run applications ranging from running simulations to web hosting. In 2008, Amazon improved the service by adding Elastic Block Store (EBS), offering persistent storage for Amazon EC2 instances and Elastic IP addresses, and offering static IP addresses designed for dynamic cloud computing. Amazon introduced SimpleDB, a database system, allowing users of its other infrastructure to utilize a high-reliability, high-performance database system. In 2008, Amazon graduated EC2 from beta to "Generally Available" and added support for the Microsoft Windows platform.

Amazon continues to refine and add services to AWS, adding such services as Scalable DNS service (Amazon Route 53), payment handling, and AWS specific APIs for its Mechanical Turk service.

In August 2012, Amazon announced Amazon Glacier, a low-cost online file storage web service that provides reliable data archiving, storage, and backup.

AWS Identity and Access Management (IAM) was launched in June 2012 and later in November 2012 at AWS' web developer conference in Las Vegas it announced it was targeting large companies as cloud storage clients. It will further cut its S3 prices to customers with long-term contracts in its "Redshift" storage service launching in 2013.

In March 2013 Amazon announced its Mobile Ads API for developers. The new Ads API can be used on apps distributed on any Android platform as long as the app is also available on Amazon's Appstore.

As of December 2014, Amazon Web Services operated 1.4 Million servers across 11 regions and 28 availability zones.

In January 2015, AWS announced its own email and scheduling service dubbed WorkMail.

== Amazon Publishing ==
Amazon Publishing is Amazon's publishing unit launched in May 2009. It is composed of AmazonEncore, AmazonCrossing, Montlake Romance, Thomas & Mercer, 47North, Powered by Amazon, New Harvest, Grand Harbor Press, Two Lions, Skyscape and Waterfall Press.

Launched in 2005, Amazon Shorts offered exclusive short stories and non-fiction pieces from best-selling authors for download from the Kindle Store. By June 2007, the program had over 1,700 pieces and was adding about 50 new pieces per week, but the program was discontinued on June 1, 2010.

== AmazonSmile ==
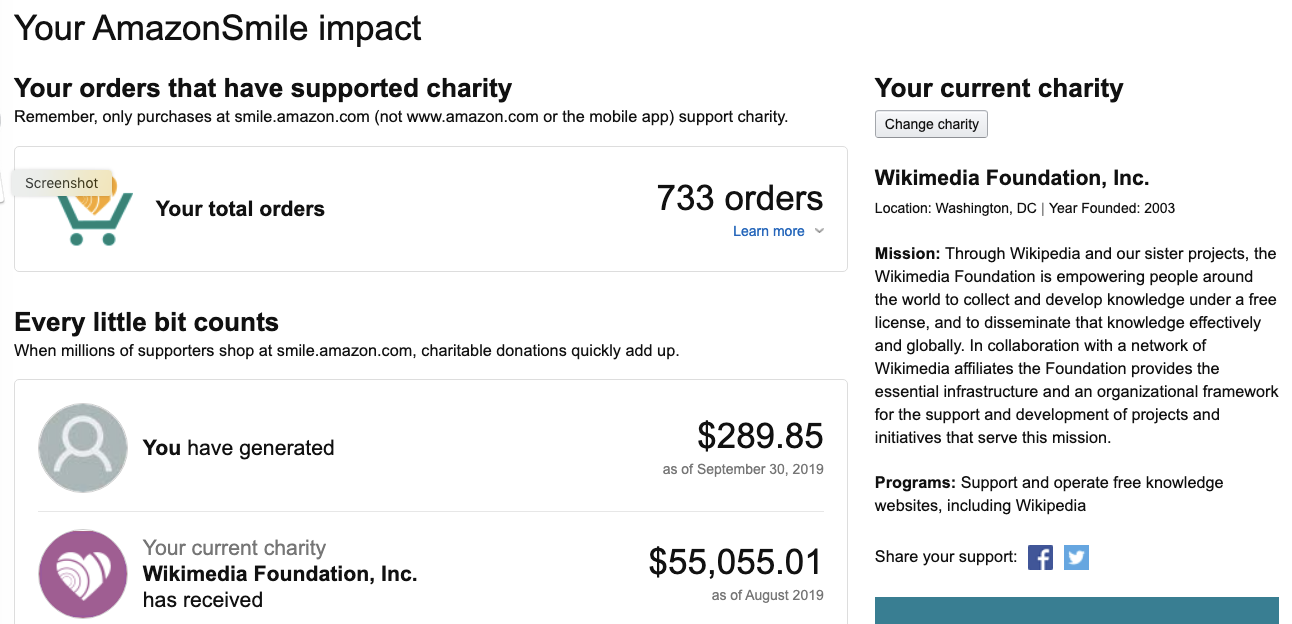
Impact of AmazonSmile donations to WikiMedia Foundation

As part of its corporate social responsibility activities, Amazon created "channels" to benefit certain causes. In 2004, Amazon allowed customers to donate $6 to $200 to the campaigns of 2004 US presidential candidates, providing links that raised $300,000 for the candidates. Amazon has periodically reactivated a Red Cross donation channel after crises such as Hurricane Sandy, Hurricane Katrina, and the 2004 earthquake and tsunami in the Indian Ocean. By January 2005, nearly 200,000 people had donated over $15.7 million in the US.

In 2013, Amazon launched a charity initiative called AmazonSmile. It could be accessed by going to smile.amazon.com, smile.amazon.co.uk, or smile.amazon.de when normally shopping, and allowed Amazon to donate 0.5% of the sale price of eligible items to the customer's selected charity as its sponsor.

On January 18, 2023, Amazon announced that it would be winding down AmazonSmile on February 20, 2023, to focus on philanthropic giving programs.

== Amazon Local ==
Amazon Local was a daily deal service launched in June 2011 in Boise, Idaho. As of 2013, Amazon Local offers daily deals to over 100 regions in 36 U.S. states. Amazon Local also acts as a deal aggregator; some of the deals are actually offered through LivingSocial, a firm in which Amazon has heavily invested.

It was launched gradually in the United Kingdom on August 29, 2012, starting in London and expanding to more towns and cities.

On December 18, 2015, Amazon Local stopped selling daily deals; however, purchased deals remained valid according to its terms.

== Retail stores ==
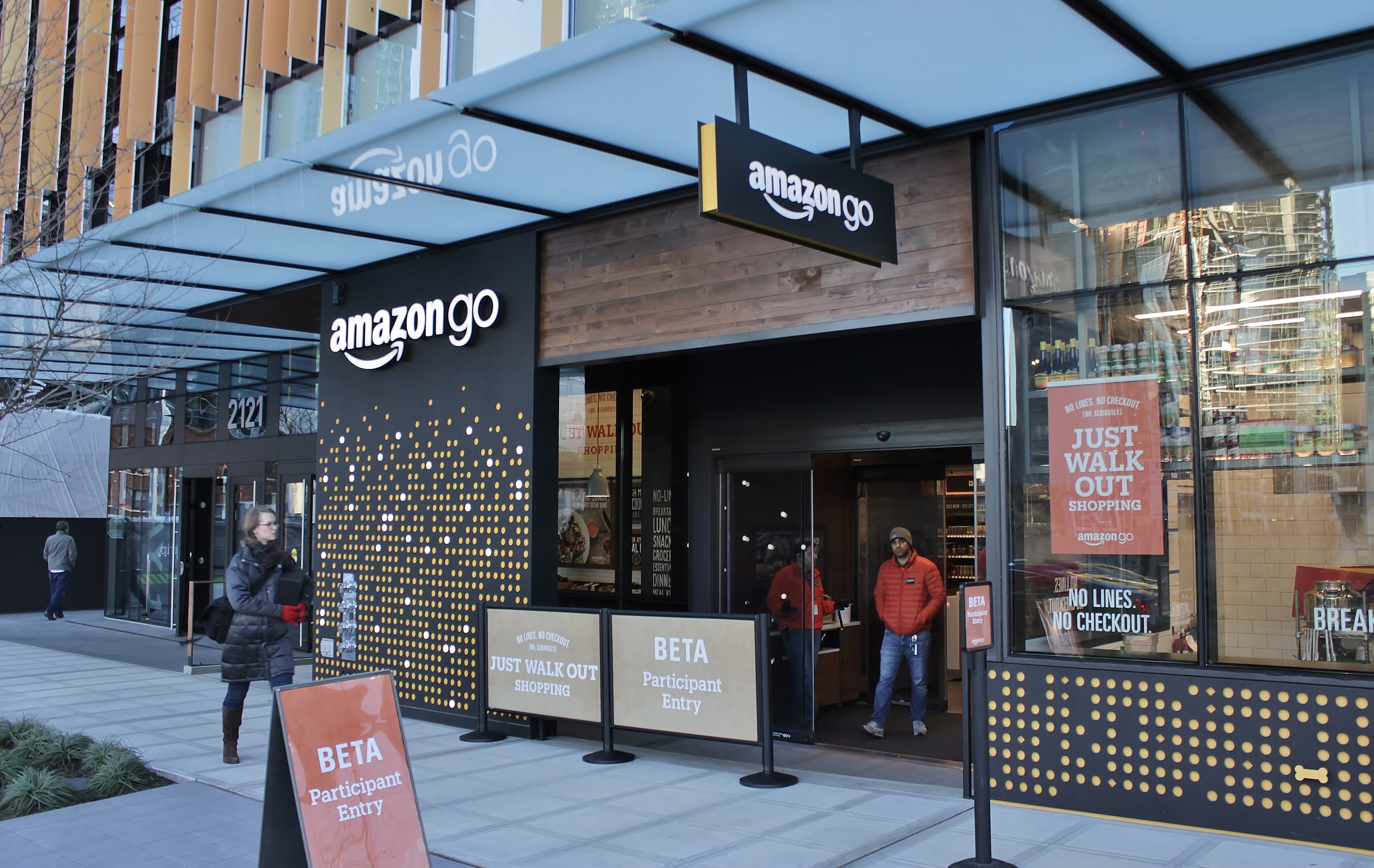
The first Amazon Go store

On November 2, 2015, Amazon opened its first physical retail store, a bookstore in the University Village shopping center in Seattle. The store, known as Amazon Books, has prices matched to those found on the Amazon website (for Prime members) and integrate online reviews into the store's shelves.

On January 22, 2018, Amazon Go, a store that uses cameras and sensors to detect items that a shopper grabs off shelves and automatically charges a shopper's Amazon account, was opened to the general public in Seattle. Customers scan their Amazon Go app as they enter, and are required to have an Amazon Go app installed on their smartphone and a linked Amazon account to be able to enter. The technology is meant to eliminate the need for checkout lines. Amazon Go was initially opened for Amazon employees in December 2016. By the end of 2018, there will be eight total Amazon Go stores located in Seattle, Chicago, San Francisco and New York. Amazon has plans to open as many as 3,000 Amazon Go locations across the United States by 2021.

Amazon announced to debut the Amazon 4-star in New York, Soho neighborhood Spring Street between Crosby and Lafayette on 27 September 2018. The store carries the 4-star and above rated products from around New York. The amazon website searches for the most rated, highly demanded, frequently bought and most wished for products which are then sold in the new amazon store under separate categories. Along with the paper price tags, the online-review cards will also be available for the customers to read before buying the product.

On November 11, 2019, Amazon announced plans to open a new type of grocery store in Los Angeles in 2020. In August 2020, Amazon revealed the name, Amazon Fresh. The chain's concept was the use of Dash Carts, which have screens and a scanner for a special code that is connected to the user's Amazon account. Customers sign in by scanning their unique codes found in the Amazon app, and as they put items in their carts, they are added to a list which gets charged to the user's credit card upon exiting the store. Unlike Amazon Go, the stores also have traditional checkouts. The first store opened in the Woodland Hills neighborhood in September 2020. A second store opened in Irvine in October 2020. Amazon Fresh currently has locations in California, Illinois, Pennsylvania, Virginia, Washington, and Washington, D.C., in the United States along with London in the United Kingdom.

== Amazon Home Services ==
In March 2015 Amazon launched a new on-demand service, Amazon Home Services, aimed at offering homeowners a marketplace for professional services such as plumbing, electrical, audio/visual installation, and lawn services (home improvement services). The Home Services category designed to make finding a specialist easy by verifying that providers are properly licensed and insured for the job. Service is "Satisfaction Guaranteed" and offers a refund if you are not happy in the end. Additionally, reviews are verified so you know the reviewer actually paid for and used the services.

== Amazon Cash/Top Up ==
Amazon Cash (in the United States and Canada) and Amazon Top Up (in the United Kingdom) are services allowing Amazon shoppers to add money to their Amazon account at a physical retail store. The service, launched in April 2017, allows users to add between $5 and $500 (£5 and £250) to their accounts by paying with cash at a participating retailer, who scans a barcode linked to a customer's Amazon account. Users can present the app on paper, on the Amazon app, or as a text message sent by the Amazon website. Participating retailers include 7-Eleven, CVS Pharmacy, and GameStop.

As of May 2024, Amazon Cash has been deprecated.

== See also ==
- List of Amazon brands
- Timeline of Amazon Web Services
