= MHUB =

mHUB is an incubator for physical product development and manufacturing headquartered in Chicago. It serves startups and manufacturing companies through its incubator, venture-backed accelerator, and research and development services.

== Facility ==
In 2023, mHUB opened an 80,000-square-foot innovation space set in the Kinzie Industrial Corridor, west of Chicago’s Fulton Market. The building is located in a federally designated Opportunity Zone. The building includes offices, prototyping labs, and testing facilities.

It relocated from a former Motorola Mobility (a Lenovo company) prototyping and testing lab where it launched in 2017.

== Partners ==
mHUB collaborates with industry partners such as Marmon, Arrow Electronics, Chamberlain Group, Chase, The U.S. Economic Development Administration, GE, Grainger, Dell, Constellation, KPMG, Baxter, and Endeavor Health.

== Founding ==
Catalyze, a coworking hub, World Business Chicago, and Mayor Rahm Emanuel kickstarted mHUB in early 2017. The non-profit 501(c)(3) organization opened on March 2, 2017, and was co-founded by Haven Allen, CEO, and Bill Fienup, Director of Innovation Services. Mayor Rahm Emanuel called the project "the final piece of the manufacturing puzzle."

== mHUB Product Impact Fund I ==
mHUB's Product Impact Fund I is a $15M venture fund that will invest in 60 early-stage physical product and hardtech ventures with deployment from 2020 To 2023. The Fund supports cohorts of the mHUB accelerator program and will make seed-stage investments of $75,000 cash and $56,750 in product development, resources and programming for 5% equity with pro rata rights.
