= List of Target brands =

Target Corporation, like many large retail and grocery chain stores, offers private brands, referred to by Target as "owned brands".

== Apparel ==
=== General ===
- All in Motion, a line of activewear with options for both men and women
- PRIDE (formerly Take Pride), a line of LGBT pride themed clothing, accessories, and other items.
- Shade & Shore, a beachwear brand

=== Men's ===
- Goodfellow & Co., men's clothing, accessories, and grooming products
- Original Use, "street style" men's clothing

=== Women's ===
- A New Day, a clothing line of general women's clothing
- Auden, an intimates and lingerie exclusive brand
- Ava & Viv, a women's clothing line
- Colsie, an intimates and loungewear brand
- Future Collective, a women's clothing line
- JoyLab, a fitness-clothing line for women
- Prologue, a line of sophisticated female clothing
- Stars Above, an in-house brand for sleepwear
- Universal Thread, denim-based women's clothing
- Wild Fable, women's clothing brand targeting gen-Z
- Xhilaration, a line of intimate and sleepwear, along with swimwear

=== Youth and infants ===
- Art Class, a children's line of apparel
- Cat and Jack, a children's line of apparel and accessories
- Cloud Island, a baby's line of bedding and clothing

== Grocery ==
- Favorite Day, specialty foods, drinks, sweets, and snacks
- Favorite Day Bakery, baked goods
- Good & Gather, a food and beverage brand; replaced Archer Farms, Simply Balanced, and Sutton & Dodge. Manufacturers include Great Lakes Cheese.
- Market Pantry, value grocery products.

== Seasonal ==
- Hyde and Eek! Boutique, a Halloween decoration brand
- Sun Squad, a line of summer items
- Wondershop, a Christmas decoration and apparel brand

== Other ==
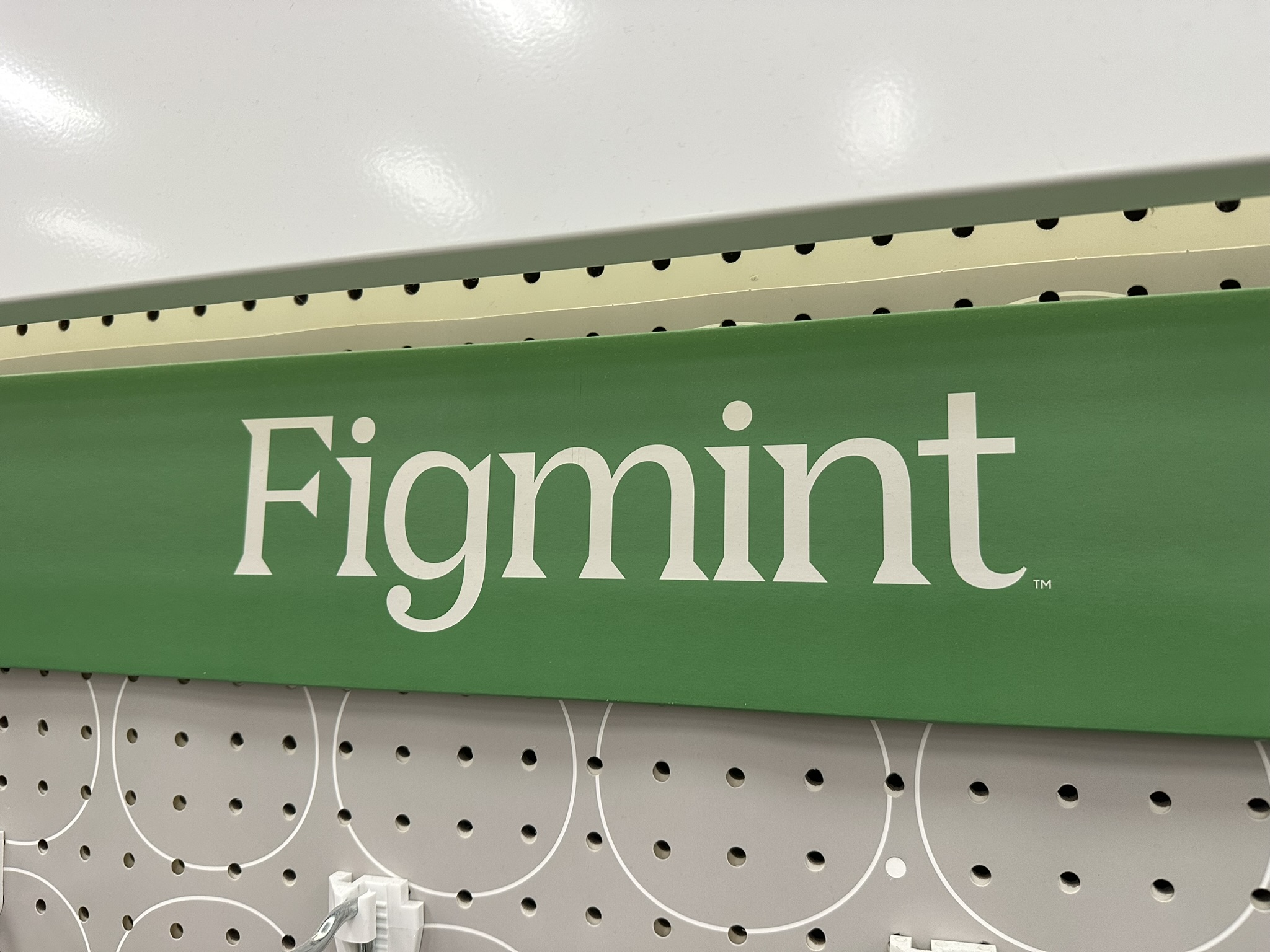
Figmint logo inside of a Target

- Boots & Barkley, a pet food and supply line
- Brightroom, a line of storage solutions
- Bullseye's Playground, a discount goods line
- Casaluna, a bedroom and bath line
- Dealworthy, a low-priced essentials brand
- Embark, an outdoor gear line of camping and travel equipment
- Everspring, a household supplies brand
- Figmint, a kitchenware brand
- Good Little Garden, a lawn and garden brand
- Gigglescape, a children's toy brand
- Hearth and Hand with Magnolia, a home and lifestyle brand, in collaboration with designer Joanna Gaines
- Heyday, a line of electronic accessories
- Kindfull, a pet food brand
- Made By Design, a homelines brand, made up of home basics such as towels, cooking utensils, glassware, plates, pots, kitchen gadgets, and more
- Mondo Llama, a line of arts and crafts supplies
- Opalhouse, eclectic home decor
- Open Story, a travel and luggage line
- Pillowfort, a children's line of bedding
- Project 62, a household-goods line placed alongside Room Essentials
- Room Essentials, a low-end home-goods line
- Smartly, an essential commodity brand, including household, healthcare, beauty, and personal-care products
- Smith & Hawken, an outdoor furniture line acquired in 2010
- Sonia Kashuk, a cosmetics brand
- Spritz, a gift/party supplies brand
- Threshold, a premium furniture line
- up&up, essential general commodities

=== Corporate ===
- Bullseye Shop, various Target branded apparel, accessories, housewares, and other items primarily for Target team members.

== Former ==
These brands are no longer in production.

- Archer Farms, a grocery brand positioned higher than the Market Pantry line
- Cherokee, a children's and women's clothing line which is no longer Target-exclusive
- Circo, toddler's and kids clothing
- Design For All, a range of products commissioned from noted designers
- Gilligan & O'Malley, women's intimates
- Go International, a women's clothing line
- Merona, a general clothing brand
- Mossimo Supply Co., a clothing line
- Simply Balanced, a grocery brand focused on organic/natural foods
- Sutton & Dodge, a grocery brand focused on butcher shop products

== See also ==
- List of Amazon brands
- List of Walmart brands
