= List of Walmart brands =

Walmart, Inc., like many large retail and grocery chain stores, uses a brand strategy that offers private brands (private label, store brand) and generic brand merchandise.

== Apparel brands ==
=== Major brands ===
In March 2018, Walmart introduced three new clothing lines and revamped an existing clothing line.

- George, scaled down to focus on men's casual and dress clothing, shoes, and accessories (previously also women's and children's)
- Terra & Sky, woman's clothing with a focus on plus sized options
- Time and Tru, woman's clothing
- Wonder Nation, children's clothing

=== Other brands ===
- Athletic Works, activewear and athletic footwear for men, women, and children
- EV1, women's casual clothing, accessories, and shoes endorsed by American television personality Ellen DeGeneres
- Free Assembly, an "elevated" lifestyle and fashion brand for men, women, and children designed for versatility and sustainability
- Joyspun, previously Secret Treasures – women's sleepwear and intimates
- No Boundaries, often abbreviated as NOBO – junior size women's and young men's clothing, shoes, and accessories targeted at Gen Z.
- Scoop, a trend-focused fashion brand offering contemporary styles in apparel and accessories
- White Stag, clothing
- Vizio, Television, Soundbars, Vizio OS, and advertising

== Major brands ==
=== Bettergoods ===
Bettergoods (stylized as bettergoods) was launched in 2024 as a higher-end line of grocery products, though still marketed as budget-friendly. The initial launch began with over 300 items aiming to show the speed with which Walmart could "bring trend and innovation to market at scale."

=== Equate ===
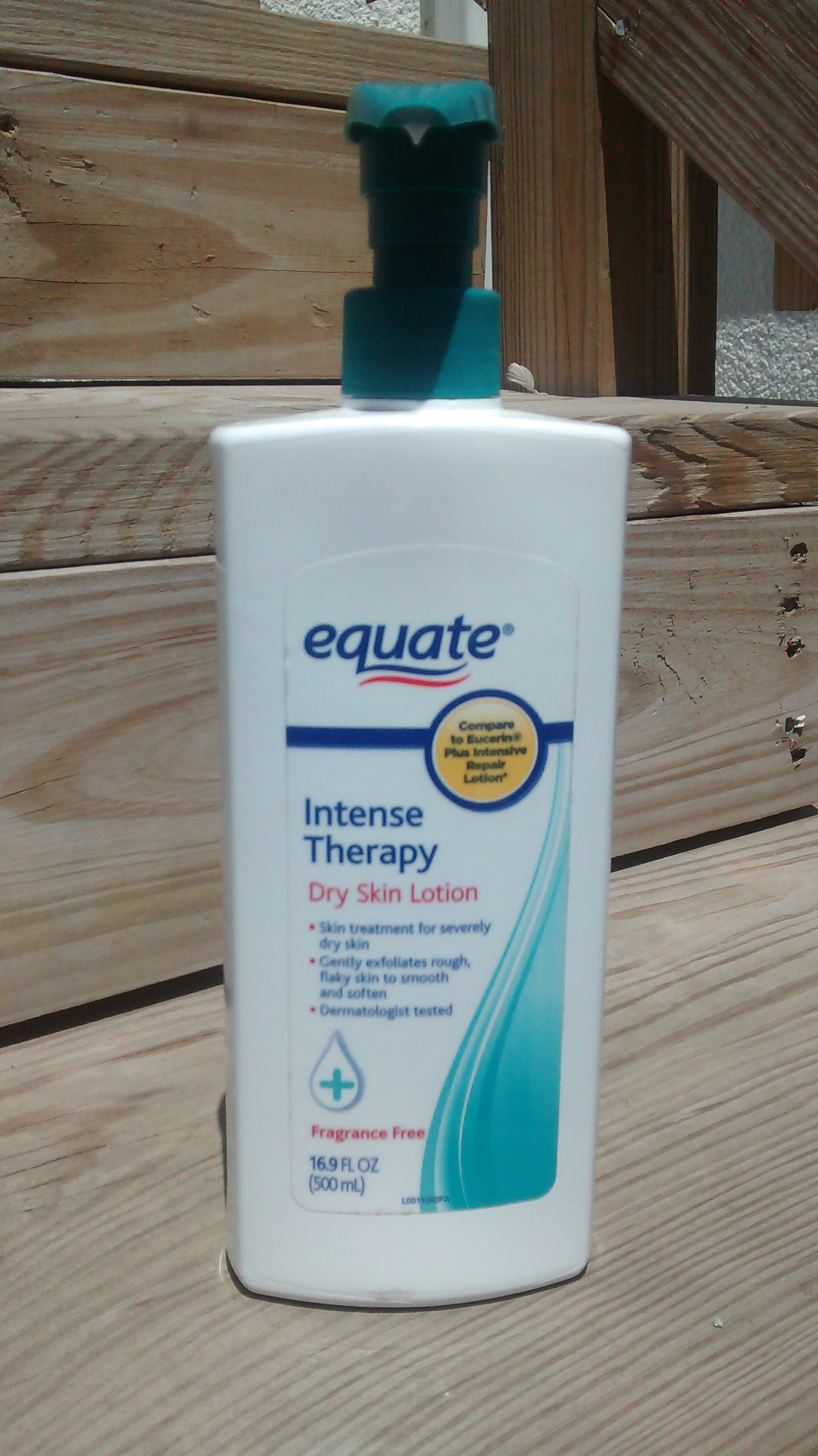
The brand name "equate" on a container of lotion

Equate is a brand used by Walmart for consumable pharmacy and health and beauty items, such as shaving cream, skin lotion, over-the-counter medications, and pregnancy tests. The Equate brand was originally created by L. Perrigo Company in 1986 and was sold to Walmart in 1993. In a 2006 study, The Hartman Group marketing research firm issued a report which found that "Five of the top 10 "likely to purchase" private label brands are managed by Walmart including: Great Value, Equate, Sam's Choice, Walmart, and Member's Mark (Sam's Club), per the study." The report further noted that "...we are struck by the magnitude of mind-share Walmart appears to hold in shoppers' minds when it comes to awareness of private label brands and retailers."

=== Great Value ===

As a house or store brand, the Great Value line does not consist of goods produced by Walmart, but is a labeling system for items manufactured and packaged by a number of agricultural and food corporations, such as ConAgra, and Sara Lee which, in addition to releasing products under its own brand and exclusively for Walmart, also manufactures and brands foods for a variety of other chain stores.

In Tokyo, Great Value brand products are sold alongside other Walmart merchandise in Seiyu grocery stores (owned by Walmart) as of October 2014, despite at least one report of a transition away from the brand.

In 2009, the Great Value labels were redesigned to be predominantly white. The new redesign also includes over 80 new items, including thin-crust pizza, fat-free caramel swirl ice cream, strawberry yogurt, organic cage-free eggs, double-stuffed sandwich cookies, and teriyaki beef jerky. Walmart changed the formulas for 750 items, including breakfast cereal, cookies, yogurt, laundry detergent, and paper towels.

On April 15, 2026, Great Value unveiled the new logo, the first in over a decade, which features a deeper shade of blue. The typography was tightened to include a subtle "smile" shape within the letters E and V. The new logo was designed by Jones Knowles Ritchie and Walmart Creative Studio, who were also involved in Walmart's rebrand in 2025. This rebrand impacted roughly 10,000 products and is planned to begin its rollout starting from snack product in May 2026 and will continue between 18 and 24 months.

Manufacturers include Great Lakes Cheese and Frutas y Hortalizas del Sur S.A.

=== Ol' Roy ===
Ol' Roy is Walmart's store brand of dog food, created in 1983 and named after Sam Walton's dog. It has become the number-one selling brand of dog food in the United States. It is comparable to Nestlé's Purina.

In 1998, samples of Ol' Roy (together with various other brands) were subject to qualitative analyses for pentobarbital residue by the U.S. Food and Drug Administration Center for Veterinary Medicine due to suspicion that the anesthetizing drug may have found its way into pet foods through euthanized animals. Pentobarbital was found in 5 out of the 8 Ol' Roy samples in the initial survey. The highest level of pentobarbital detected among all dog foods tested was an Ol' Roy formulation (Puppy Formula, Chicken and Rice) at 32ppb. The CVM concluded this level of pentobarbital would be unlikely to cause adverse effects even to the smallest dogs.

=== Sam's Choice ===
Sam's Choice, originally introduced as Sam's American Choice in 1991, is a retail brand in food and selected hard goods. Named after Sam Walton, founder of Walmart, Sam's Choice forms the premium tier of Walmart's two-tiered core corporate grocery branding strategy that also includes the larger Great Value brand of discount-priced staple items.

Most Sam's Choice beverage products are manufactured for Walmart by Cott Beverages.

== Additional brands ==
Onn

- Allswell, a luxury bedding and mattress brand owned by Walmart, but only sold direct to consumer
- AutoDrive, car products
- Beautiful, home decor; from Drew Barrymore
- Co Squared, a cosmetics brand owned by Walmart, but only sold direct to consumer
- Concord, bicycles, ebikes, and related accessories
- Douglas tires, tires
- Earth Spirit, shoes
- EverStart, car batteries
- Expert Grill, grilling tools and gadgets
- Freshness Guaranteed, bakery, bread, and deli products
- Hart tools, power tools, hand tools, and storage options
- Hello Hobby, crafting supplies
- Holiday Time, seasonal and Christmas-specific decorations and trees
- Hotel Style, linens
- Hyper Tough, tools
- Mainstays, home essentials including bedding, furniture, kitchenware, and decor
- Marketside, sliced and prepared produce, ready-to-cook/eat meals, and packaged meat cuts and seafood produced in Bentonville AR.
- Mash-Up Coffee, luxury coffee beans
- Oak Leaf, low-cost wines produced and bottled for Walmart selling at approximately $3 a bottle.
- Onn, personal electronics and accessories
- Overpowered, pre-built gaming desktops and laptops
- Ozark Trail, camping gear, outdoor equipment, and active lifestyle products
- Parent's Choice, baby products, including diapers, wipes, and formula
- Pen + Gear, office supplies and stationery
- Spring Valley, vitamins and dietary supplements
- Super Tech, Motor oils and automotive accessories
- Tasty, kitchen tools (Walmart exclusive under license from BuzzFeed)
- Thyme & Table, a Walmart brand known for kitchenware
- Uniquely J, a brand under Walmart's Jet.com website
- Walmart Family Mobile, Walmart's exclusive prepaid mobile phone (cell phone) service provided by Tracfone through the Verizon cellular network.
- Way to Celebrate, party supplies, holiday decor, and seasonal goods

== Former brands ==
- 725 Originals was a brand at Walmart Canada that targeted teens. It was consolidated into the George label in 2010.

== See also ==
- Big-box store
- List of Amazon brands
- List of Target brands
- Niagara Bottling
