= National brand =

Marketing term

A national brand is the brand of a product that is distributed nationally under a brand name owned by a producer or distributor as opposed to local brands distributed only in some areas of a country and to private labels that carry a brand owned by the retailer rather than the producer.

Marketing and advertising may give consumers the impression that a national-brand product is superior to a local or private-labeled product. Both types use an advertising tactic involving giving away promotional products. Entrepreneur Magazine explains more concisely, "physical gifts with your advertising on it such as balloons, smartphone wipes, key chains, fridge magnets, pens and notepads are always popular too."
