= Amazon Prime =

Paid subscription service offered by Amazon

- Website type: Subscription service
- Founded: February 2, 2005; 21 years ago
- Headquarters: Seattle, Washington, U.S.
- Area served: Australia, Austria, Belgium, Brazil, Canada, China, Colombia, France, Germany, India, Ireland, Italy, Japan, Luxembourg, Malaysia, Mexico, Netherlands, Poland, Portugal, Saudi Arabia, Singapore, South Africa, Spain, Sweden, Thailand, Turkey, United Kingdom, United States
- Owner: Amazon
- Industry: Internet
- Revenue: ▲$19.21 billion (2019)
- Website: amazonprime.com
- Registration: Required
- Users: ▲220 million
- Current status: Active

Amazon Prime (styled as prime) is a paid subscription service and loyalty program of Amazon which is available in many countries and gives users access to additional services otherwise unavailable or available at a premium to other Amazon customers. Founded on February 2, 2005, services include logistics through same, one- or two-day delivery of goods, healthcare through the optional perk of One Medical primary care services, entertainment through streaming music, video, e-books, gaming, and grocery shopping services. In April 2021, Amazon reported that Prime had 200 million subscribers worldwide.

== History ==
=== Early history ===
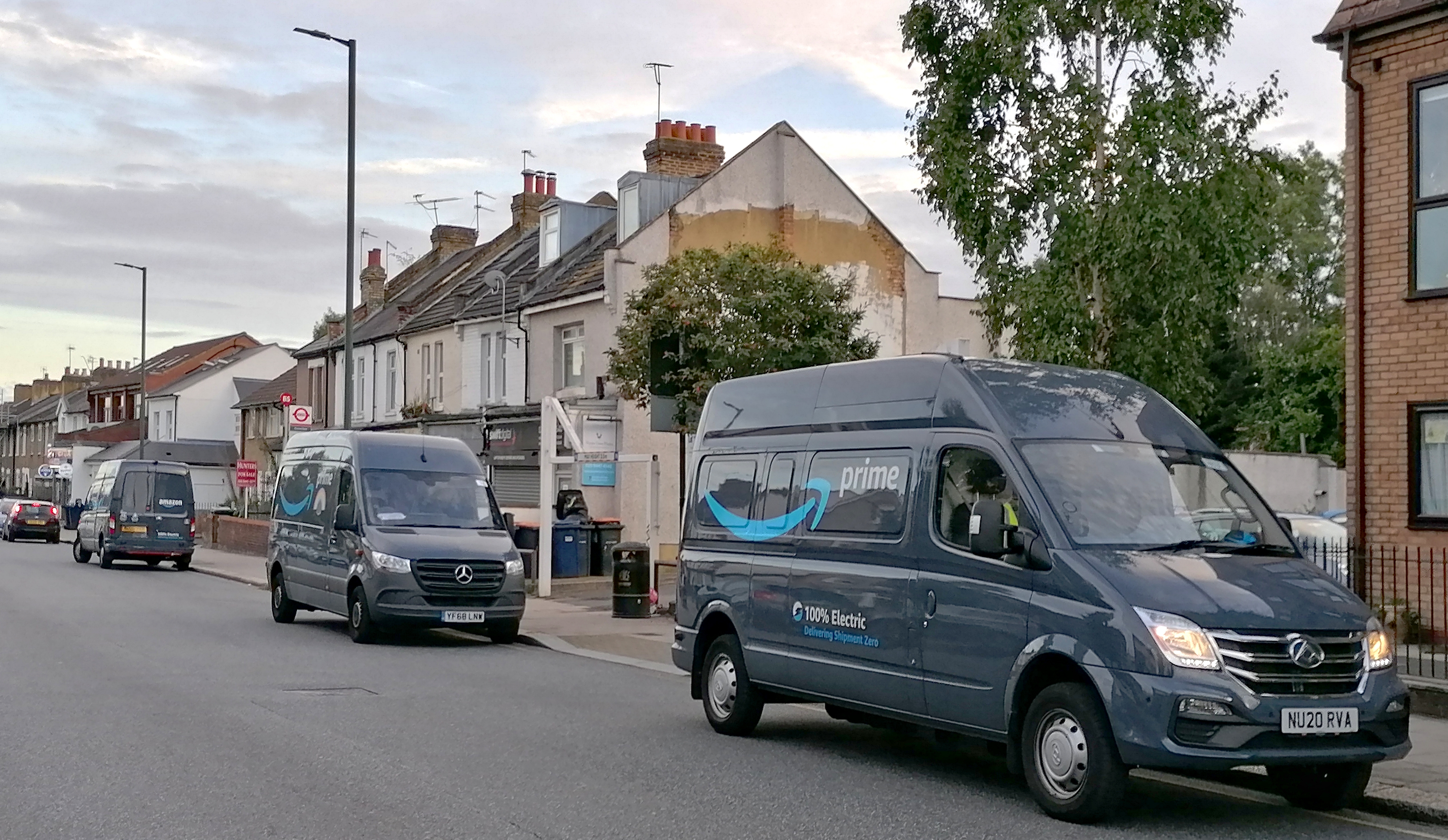
Amazon Prime electric delivery vans in North London

In 2005, Amazon announced Amazon Prime as a membership service offering free two-day shipping within the contiguous United States on all eligible purchases for an annual fee of $79 (equivalent to $130 in 2025) and discounted one-day shipping rates. Amazon launched the program in Germany, Japan and the United Kingdom in 2007; in France in 2008, in Italy in 2011, in Canada in 2013, in India in July 2016, in Mexico in March 2016, in Australia in June 2018, in Turkey in September 2020, in Sweden in September 2021, in Poland in October 2021, and in Egypt in July 2022. Amazon Prime is also available in Ireland, with a new fulfillment center having opened in Dublin in 2022. As of October 2021, there are Prime members in 22 countries in North America, Europe and Asia–Pacific.

=== 2012–2016 ===
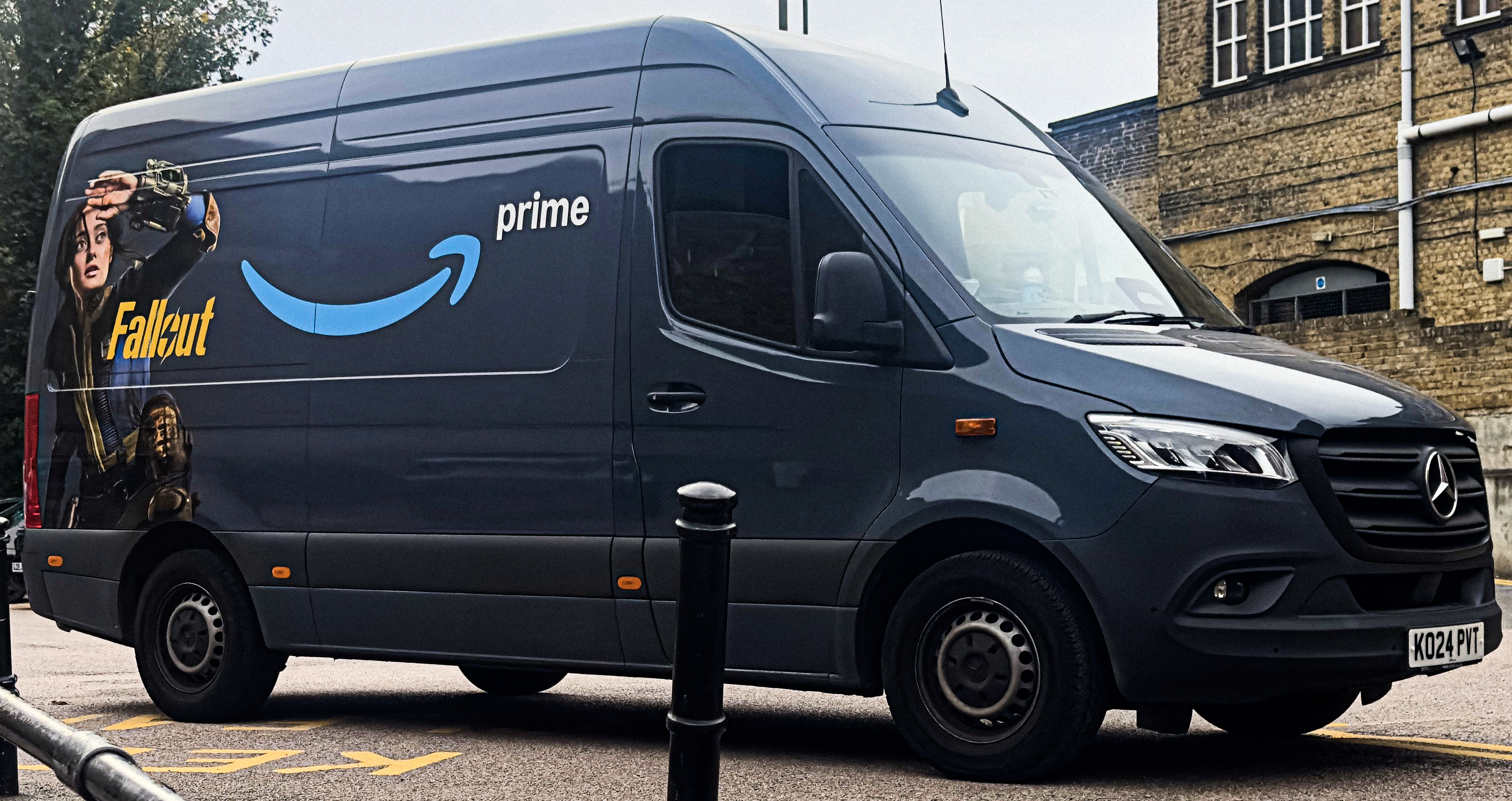
Fallout themed Amazon Prime delivery van in Chatham, Kent, England

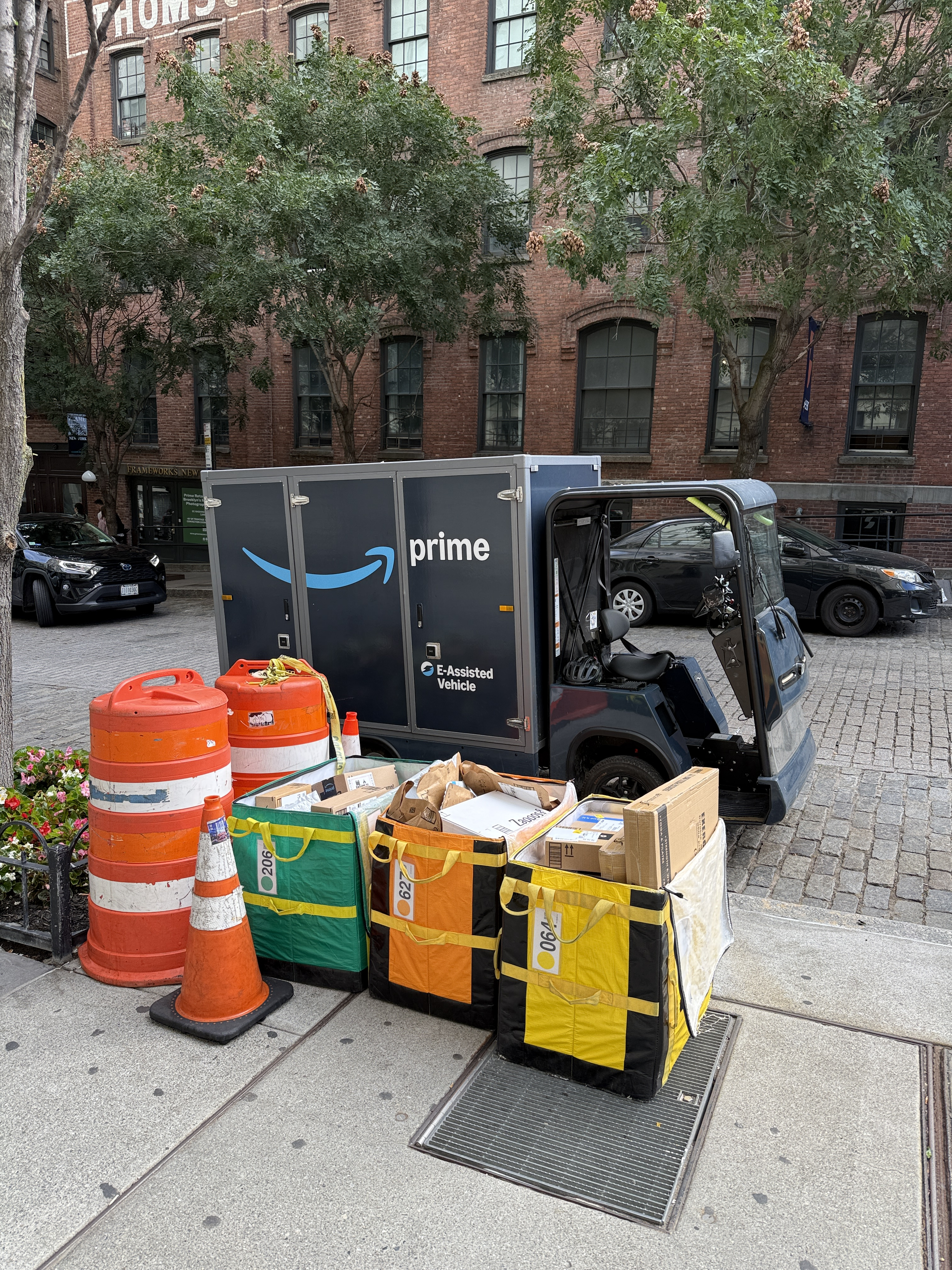
Amazon Prime E-Assisted vehicle in Brooklyn, New York

Amazon Prime membership in Australia, Canada, Germany, Italy, the United Kingdom, India, and the United States includes Amazon Video, the instant streaming of selected films and TV programs at no additional cost. In November 2011, it was announced that Prime members had access to the Kindle Owners' Lending Library, which allows users to borrow up to one title a month of specified popular Kindle e-books. People with an email address at an academic domain such as .edu or .ac.uk, typically students, are eligible for Prime Student privileges, including discounts on Prime membership.

In March 2014, Amazon increased the annual US membership fee for Amazon Prime from $79 to $99. Shortly after this change, Amazon announced Prime Music, providing unlimited, ad-free music streaming. In November 2014, Amazon added Prime Photos, adding unlimited storage of files deemed to be photographs in the users' Amazon Drive. Amazon began offering free same-day delivery to Prime members in 14 United States metropolitan areas in May 2015. In April 2015, Amazon started a trial partnership with Audi and DHL in order to deliver directly into the trunks of Audi cars, available in the Munich, Germany, area to some Audi-connected car users.

In December 2015, Amazon stated that "tens of millions" of people were Amazon Prime members. Amazon Prime added 3 million members during the third week of December 2015. That month Amazon announced the creation of the Streaming Partners Program, a subscription service that provides Amazon Prime subscribers with additional streaming video services. Among the programming providers involved in the program are Showtime, Starz. Lifetime Movie Club (containing recent original movie titles from Lifetime and LMN), Smithsonian Earth, and Qello Concerts.

=== 2016–2022 ===
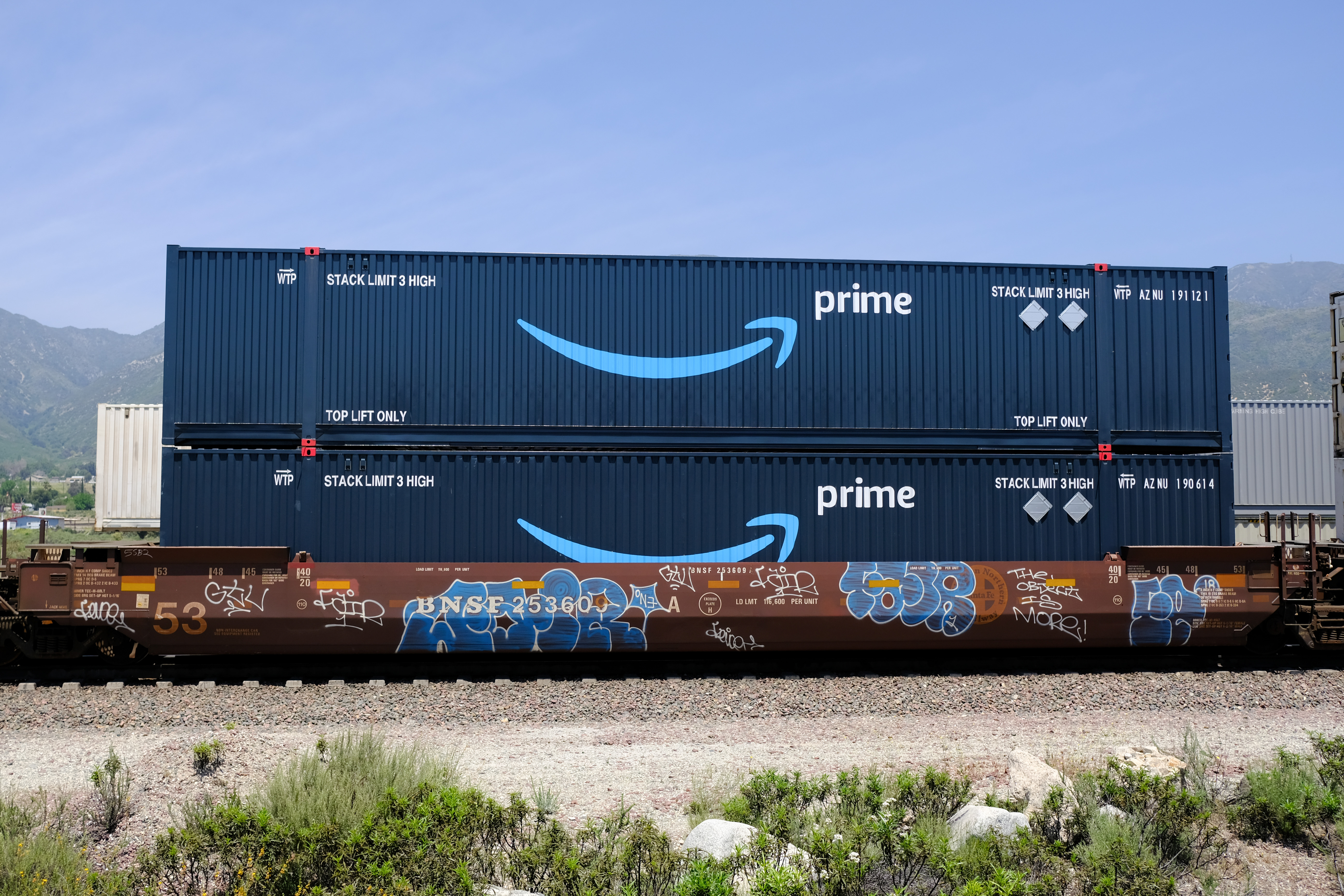
Two intermodal containers with the Amazon Prime logo in 2020

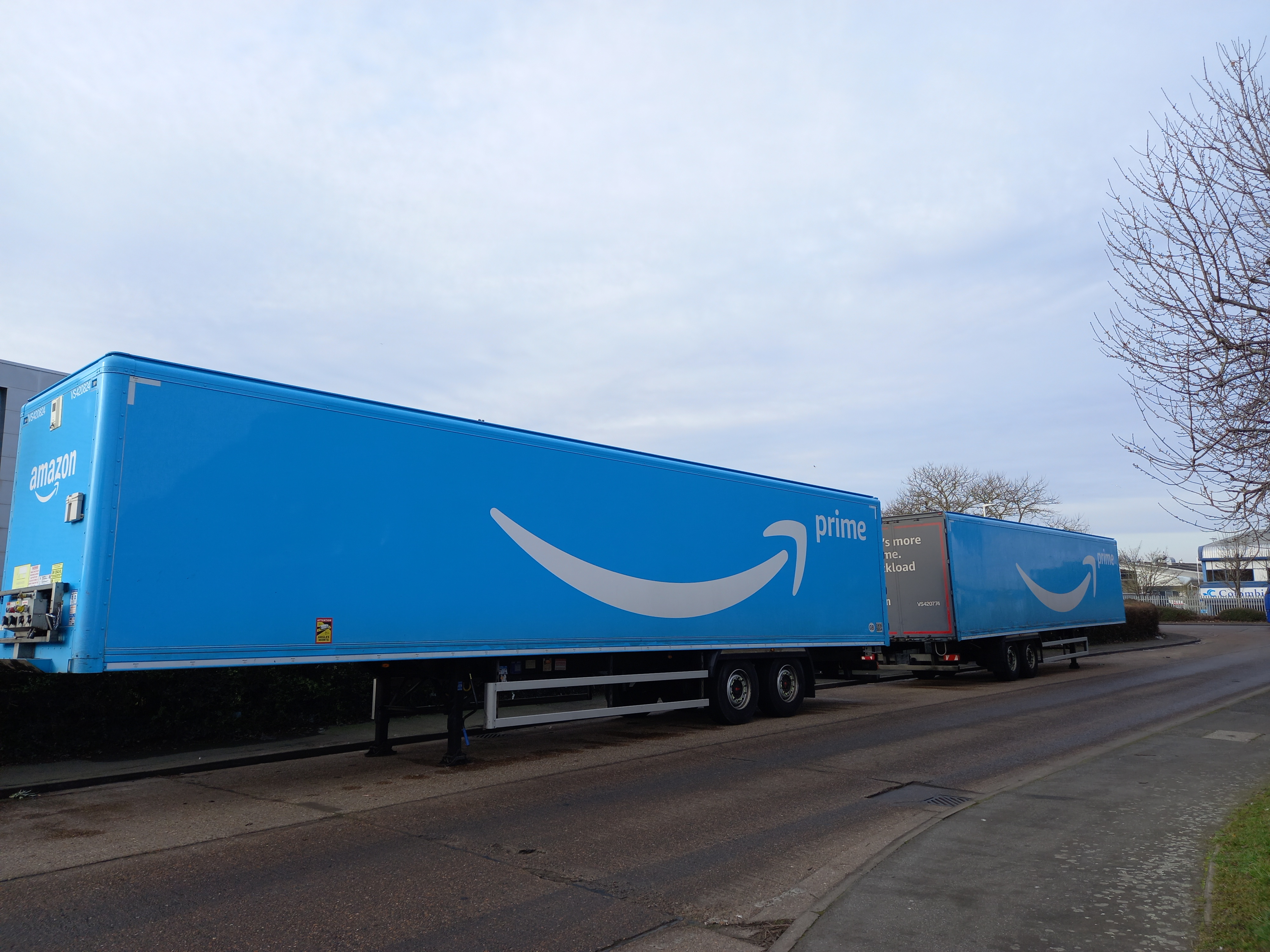
Two Amazon semi-trailers in the United Kingdom in 2022

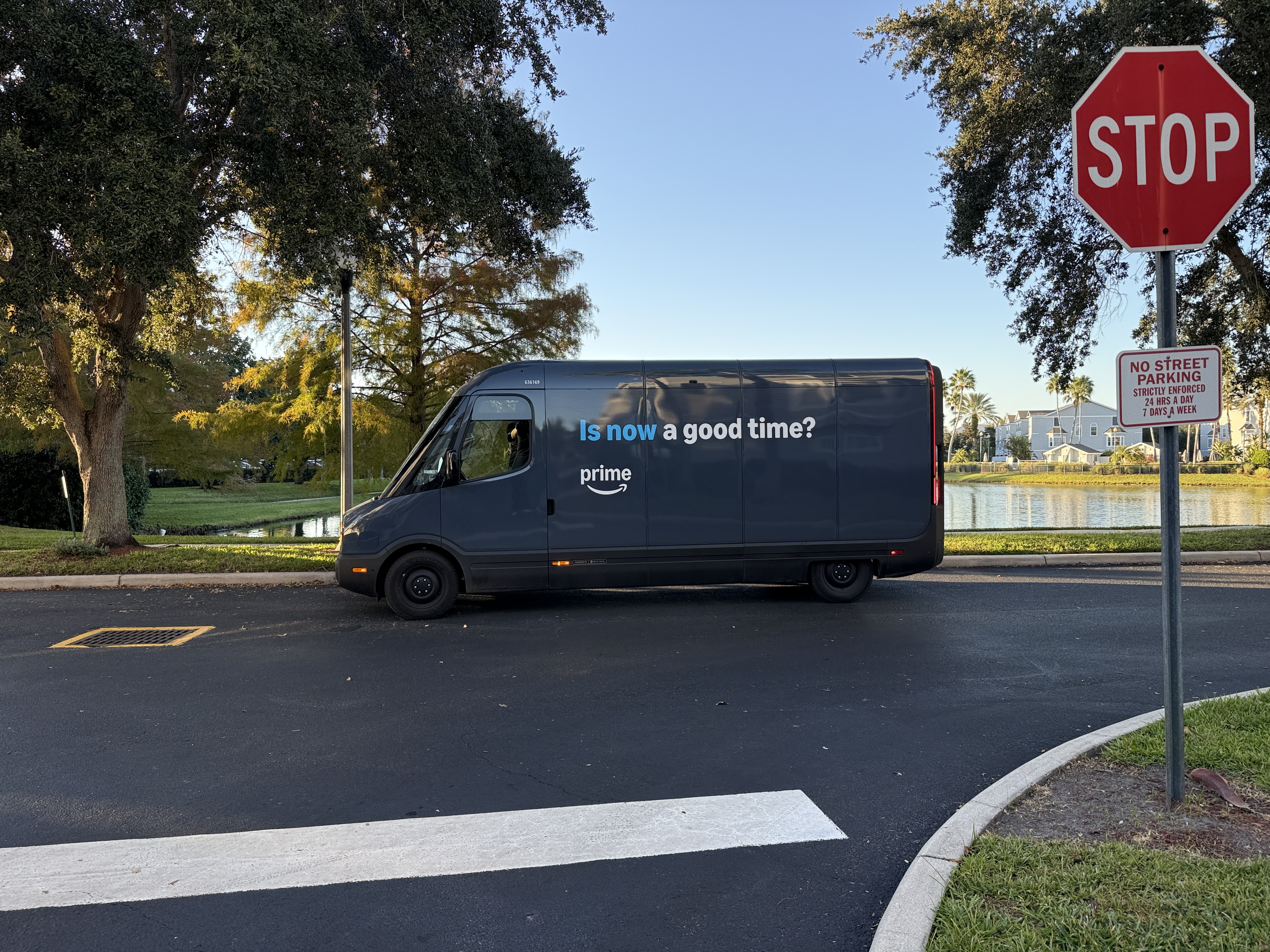
A Rivian EDV electric delivery van in Orlando, Florida, in 2025

In January 2016, Amazon Prime reached 54 million members according to a report from Consumer Intelligence Research Partners. Several reports in January 2016 said that nearly half of all U.S. households were members of Amazon Prime at that time. In April 2016, Amazon announced same-day delivery would be expanded to include the areas of Charlotte, Cincinnati, Fresno, Louisville, Milwaukee, Nashville, Central New Jersey, Raleigh, Richmond, Sacramento, Stockton, and Tucson, bringing total coverage to 27 metro areas. In September 2016, Amazon launched a restaurant delivery service for Prime members in London, England, with free delivery on all orders over £15.

In September 2016, Amazon subsidiary Twitch announced features available to users with an Amazon Prime subscription (Twitch Prime), including monthly offers of video games and add-on content, and the ability to purchase a free subscription to a user's channel once per-month. Amazon then partnered with different game developers offering in-game loots as rewards to subscribers. Games included with the loot rewards were Apex Legends, Legends of Runeterra, Ultimate Team, Teamfight Tactics, Mobile Legends: Bang Bang, Doom Eternal, and more. In December 2016, Amazon began offering Prime membership for an alternative monthly, instead of yearly fee, of $10.99 per month, increased to $12.99 in February 2018. Amazon also announced Wickedly Prime, an own-brand line of food and beverages available to Prime members.

Amazon announced Prime Wardrobe, a service that lets customers try on clothes before they pay, in June 2017. Also in 2017, Amazon announced the Prime Exclusive Phone program, which offers some smartphones displaying Amazon ads on the lock screen from companies including LG, Motorola and Nokia at a discount. In January 2025, Amazon discontinued its Try Before You Buy service (formerly known as Prime Wardrobe).

In May 2018, Amazon increased the annual US Prime membership fee from $99 to $119. In June 2019, Amazon expanded its one-day delivery with Amazon Prime, stating that Prime Free One Day was available to U.S. members on more than 10 million products with no minimum purchase.

In June 2018, Amazon launched Prime Australia, with a two-business-day delivery promise, free delivery of international orders, and Amazon Video.

On March 3, 2020, Amazon announced it installed "mini-fulfillment centers" in select U.S. cities, including Dallas, Orlando, Philadelphia, and Phoenix to reduce same-day delivery times. Later the same month, during the COVID-19 pandemic, Prime express delivery dates for various in-stock items reached delays of up to a month in the US instead of the usual 1–2 days, as Amazon struggled to meet exceptional demand and announced it would prioritize the most essential items. By the end of 2020, Amazon Prime Pantry had been discontinued in all locations.

In February 2022, Amazon announced its first increase in almost four years for the annual US Prime membership fee from $119 to $139. The increase was due to higher labor and shipping costs.

In April 2022, Amazon launched "Buy with Prime", a new service for Prime members that allows them to purchase goods from partnered merchants and take advantage of Amazon's logistics, return and exchange services.

On August 1, 2022, Amazon Prime was available for the first time in Indonesia, Thailand and the Philippines. Its presence aims to develop local and international content for users in Indonesia, the most considerable economic in Southeast Asia. Later, users can access Prime Video through the official website through various platforms, such as mobile devices, tablets, and laptops.

=== 2023–present ===
In January 2023, Amazon announced the launch of RXPass, a prescription drug delivery service. It allows US Amazon Prime members to pay a $5 monthly fee for access to 60 medications. The service was launched immediately after the announcement except in states with specific prescription delivery requirements. Beneficiaries of government healthcare programs such as Medicaid are not eligible for RxPass. In addition, Prime Rx offers discounts on generic and brand-name medications and discounts at pharmacies including Amazon Pharmacy.

In June 2023, the Federal Trade Commission (FTC) sued Amazon for its "years-long effort to enroll consumers into its Prime program without their consent while knowingly making it difficult for consumers to cancel their subscriptions".

In April 2024, Amazon announced the launch of a new delivery service for groceries for Prime customers and those receiving government assistance for food. Regular Prime subscribers would be charged $9.99 per month on orders $35 and higher from Whole Foods and Amazon Fresh, along with other prominent chains like Save Mart, Bartell Drugs, Rite Aid, and Pet Food Express and local grocery and specialty retail stores on the platform. Individuals on government assistance would be charged a reduced fee of $4.99 and would not need to be a Prime member. Amazon said it would be available in more than 3,500 locations around the country when announcing. Prior to the announcement, it was given a successful trial run in several cities in the US. It came at a time when competitors like Target and Walmart were expanding their fresh food operations.

In the United States and in the United Kingdom, Amazon Prime has an Amazon Household program where members of a household can share Amazon Prime delivery benefits and access to Prime Video. Amazon rebranded Amazon Household to Amazon Family in 2025. In other countries such as Germany, users can only share delivery benefits.

In October 2024, Amazon announced a fuel discount program allowing Prime members to save 10 cents per gallon at around 7,000 participating BP, Amoco, and ampm stations across the United States. In 2025, to coincide with Prime Day, Amazon expanded the program to more than 7,500 participating BP, Amoco, and ampm stations. The deal was launched to compete with a similar fuel savings program with Walmart+ for ExxonMobil stations.

Amazon Pharmacy launched in November 2020. It sells medications at what Amazon claims are “affordable prices to customers in the United States, with or without insurance". Amazon Pharmacy discloses pricing with Prime and insurance directly on the Amazon site. Amazon Prime membership is integrated with Amazon Pharmacy and allows customers in the United States to order prescription medications for home delivery with pharmacist support. While a Prime membership is not required to use the pharmacy, members may receive benefits such as prescription delivery and access to certain medication discounts. The service accepts insurance plans and prescriptions can be sent by healthcare providers.

Since 2020, Prime members have access to Amazon Kids+, which, according to Amazon, has “ad-free and age-appropriate books, games, videos, music, apps, and Alexa Skills".

After December 31, 2023, customers could no longer access files through the Amazon Drive apps and instead were directed to the Amazon Photos website. Prime members receive unlimited full-resolution photo storage and 5 GB of video storage. Customers can also share photos with up to five family members and display images on.

In February 2026, Amazon launched its Alexa+ AI assistant in the United States. The service was priced at $19.99 per month, with access included for Amazon Prime members.

In March 2026, Amazon announced that 1-hour and 3-hour delivery options were available in some locations, with discounted delivery fees for Prime members. The following May, Amazon debuted Amazon Now, which has a delivery guarantee of 30 minutes or less on selected items such as some groceries and household sundries; Prime members pay a discounted delivery fee.

== Sub-brands ==
=== Prime Access ===
Prime Access is a discounted membership for qualifying government assistance recipients and income-verified customers. It includes the same features as Prime.

=== Prime Music ===
Amazon Music is an ad-free music streaming service that is included in the cost of the standard Amazon Prime membership. It began in 2007. In November 2022, the music catalog was significantly expanded to 100 million songs. Amazon offers a separate subscription service called Amazon Music Unlimited, which costs $11.99 per month for Prime members and $12.99 per month for non-members. It began in 2007. In November 2022, the music catalog was significantly expanded, and the style was changed to be similar to Pandora. This means that when users choose a song, Prime Music plays something similar, rather than the specific song that was selected. When users dislike the song substituted by Prime Music, they can skip a limited number of songs per hour. This change was introduced as part of an effort to bolster Amazon against rival offerings from Walmart.

=== Prime Video ===
The service debuted on September 7, 2006, as Amazon Unbox in the United States. On September 4, 2008, the service was renamed Amazon Video on Demand. The Unbox name still refers to the local program, which as of August 2014 is no longer available for downloading purchased instant videos. On February 22, 2011, the service rebranded as Amazon Instant Video.

The services grew and in 2011 Amazon bought UK based streaming and by mail DVD rental service named Lovefilm in 2011 and now the combined services were relaunched as Prime Video.

=== Prime Gaming ===
Amazon re-branded its Twitch Prime to Amazon Prime Gaming in 2020. Amazon Prime subscribers also get Prime Gaming at no additional cost. The main difference is that "to access Prime Gaming, customers don't need to have a Twitch account (as they did for Twitch Prime)".

Prime Gaming subscribers can redeem free video games, as well as various rewards in external video games such as digital loot, currency or cosmetics that would typically cost money or are exclusive. The selection of games and rewards on offer changes over time, but redeemed games and rewards can be kept even after one's Prime Gaming subscription ends. Additionally, Prime Gaming allows for a free paid subscription to one Twitch affiliate or partner per month.

On October 1, 2025, Amazon announced they would be retiring the Prime Gaming brand and rebranding it under Amazon Luna.

=== Prime Reading ===
Beginning in October 2016, Prime members in the U.S. receive access to a rotating set of Kindle e-books through Prime Reading, in addition to a selection from its “editors’ picks” and access to Amazon Original Stories – original, short fiction and nonfiction published by Amazon. Prime members also have access to books with Audible narration, and a catalogue of eBooks, audiobooks, comics, and manga. Some magazines and travel guides are also available through the service. Prime Reading is unrelated to Kindle Unlimited and Kindle First, both of which continue to be available or the Kindle Owners Lending Library, which was discontinued in January 2021.

=== Prime Pantry ===
Amazon Prime Pantry was a service of Amazon available only to Prime members that packaged everyday (non-bulk) food preservation grocery store items into a single box for delivery for a flat fee. The service was available in the United States, Austria, France, Germany, India, Italy, Japan, Spain, and the United Kingdom. Amazon discontinued the program in different locations on different dates, making the items formerly found exclusively in Prime Pantry available for purchase in the main store. An ever-changing but limited variety of products was offered, but the range actually decreased from when the service was first launched. While selecting items within the Prime Pantry program, each item listed the percentage of space it will take up inside the delivery box. A running total showed how full this box is. The delivery fee remained the same regardless of the filling percentage. By the end of 2020 the service had been discontinued in all locations.

=== Prime Now ===
In December 2014, Amazon announced that as a benefit to Prime members located in parts of Manhattan and New York City the capability to get products delivered to them within one hour for a fee of $7.99, or within two hours for no additional fee. As of 2014, 25,000 daily essential products were available with this delivery service. In February 2015, the service was extended to include all of Manhattan. By mid-2016, it had been expanded in the United States to include parts of Chicago, Miami, Baltimore, Seattle, Dallas, Atlanta, Austin, Nashville, Portland, San Antonio, and Tampa. Outside of the United States, it has expanded to parts of the United Kingdom, Italy, Germany, France, Spain, Japan, and Singapore. To meet the on-demand needs of Prime Now, Amazon further launched Amazon Flex, a platform for independent contractors to provide delivery services.

=== Prime for Young Adults ===
On June 17, 2025, Prime Student relaunched as Prime for Young Adults, a discounted membership for 18-24-year-olds and higher education students. It includes the same features as Prime.

=== Amazon Key ===
In-Garage
At CES 2019, Amazon announced a partnership with the Chamberlain Group, allowing packages to be placed in customers' garages with myQ-enabled openers as part of the Key service. The service began a wider rollout to Prime members in 50 U.S. cities in April 2019. It works with smart garage controllers operated through the myQ (Chamberlain and LiftMaster), Aladdin Connect (Genie), and OHD Anywhere (Overhead Door Corporation) apps, and supports Amazon packages as well as Amazon Fresh and Whole Foods Market grocery orders in the United States; customers can optionally link a Ring camera to view deliveries.

In-Garage Delivery is selected at checkout after a customer links a compatible garage through the Amazon app's Amazon Key settings. It is offered for a per-order fee, which Amazon waives for orders scheduled through its Amazon Day option that consolidates deliveries onto a single chosen day. Amazon states that drivers pass background checks, that access is granted through one-time authentication of the driver, package, and delivery location, and that the garage cannot be reopened once a delivery is complete; customers can block garage access or revert to doorstep delivery at any time.

As of 2026, In-Garage Delivery is the only Amazon Key delivery option offered to consumers, following the discontinuation of the In-Home and In-Car services.

=== Prime Air ===
60 Minutes reported on December 1, 2013, that Amazon Prime Air was a possible future delivery service expected to be in development for several more years. In concept, the process would use drones to deliver small packages (less than five pounds) within 30 minutes by flying short distances (10–20 km) from local Amazon Fulfillment Centers. In the United States, the project will require the Federal Aviation Administration to approve commercial use of unmanned drones.

In July 2014, it was revealed the company was developing its 8th and 9th drone prototypes, some that could fly 50 miles an hour and carry 5-pound packages, and had applied to the FAA to test them. The project is not yet in flight as of January 2021, though Amazon did receive FAA approval in the US in August 2020.

On June 13, 2022, Amazon announced that they will be delivering products using Prime Air drones to customers residing in the small town of Lockeford, California. At the time of announcement, there is no exact launch date other than "later this year", as Amazon awaits permission from the FAA and Lockeford officials.

== Prime Day ==
On July 15, 2015, to commemorate the website's 20th anniversary, Amazon held its first Prime Day. The event is characterized by a number of sales and promotions exclusive to Amazon Prime subscribers, with Amazon initially promoting that it would feature "more deals than Black Friday". The inaugural Prime Day faced criticism over the quality of the discounts offered, with many of them being tied to items not in high demand. Some users jokingly described the event as a "yard sale", and Walmart also countered the event with a promotional blog post arguing that customers "shouldn't have to pay $100 to find great deals". Amazon defended criticism of the event, stating that order volume on the website had "surpassed" Black Friday sales in 2014. That same month, Amazon Prime announced that it had signed Jeremy Clarkson, Richard Hammond, and James May, formerly of BBC's Top Gear, to begin working on The Grand Tour for Amazon Prime Video, which was released in 2016.

On July 13, 2016, Amazon Prime said customers placed 60 percent more orders worldwide on "Prime Day". The 2018 edition was preceded by a concert event headlined by Ariana Grande, and streamed on Amazon Video and Twitch. The 2019 concert was held on July 10 ahead of Prime Day starting on July 15, and streamed exclusively for Prime subscribers, featuring Taylor Swift, Dua Lipa, Becky G, and SZA.

In 2018, Prime Day first became tied to protests of Amazon and employee strikes due to criticism of Amazon. Supporters of these actions have urged boycotts of Amazon during Prime Day as solidarity, covering all services provided by the company and its subsidiaries.

In 2020, Prime Day was postponed in the US and Canada due to the COVID-19 pandemic, and was held from October 13–14. Prime Day was held in India on August 6–7.

In May 2021, Prime Day was postponed indefinitely in Canada due to COVID-19.

In 2022, building on the delayed October 2020 version, Amazon launched a second annual Prime-exclusive sales event in October, initially called the Prime Early Access Sale, and then renamed Prime Big Deal Days in 2023. The fall event is also referred to as "Prime Day", or as "October Prime Day", by some publications.

In 2023, Prime Day was held from July 11–12, and Prime Big Deal Days was held from October 10–11.

In 2024, Prime Day was held from July 16–17 and was available in the following countries: Australia, Austria, Belgium, Brazil, Canada, Egypt, France, Germany, Italy, Japan, Luxembourg, Mexico, the Netherlands, Poland, Portugal, Saudi Arabia, Singapore, Spain, Sweden, Turkey, the United Arab Emirates, the United States and the United Kingdom. The 2024 edition of Prime Big Deal Days was held from October 8–9.

In 2025, Prime Day took place from July 8 to 11, extending to four days instead of two. Prime Big Deal Days ran from October 7 to 8, 2025. In 2026, Prime Day is scheduled to occur June 23–26.

Prime Day has demonstrated cases of misleading discounting. Various items of 2025's Prime Day shows discounts from a marked up price set months prior as revealed by price tracking website Camelcamelcamel. Certain items also showed the discounted price to be identical to the prices at other retailers. List price inflation by Amazon Prime has been demonstrated multiple times in previous years, including 2022, 2019, and 2017. Critics have also accused Prime Day as encouraging impulse shopping.

== Availability ==
As of June 2025, Prime memberships are available in 28 countries: Australia, Austria, Belgium, Brazil, Canada, China, Colombia, France, Germany, India, Ireland, Italy, Japan, Luxembourg, Malaysia, Mexico, Netherlands, Poland, Portugal, Saudi Arabia, Singapore, South Africa, Spain, Sweden, Thailand, Turkey, United Kingdom, United States.

The service stopped working in Russia in March 2022, and in Belarus in January 2023.

As of 2025, while a valid debit or credit card is required to be provided as a backup payment method, it is possible to pay for Amazon Prime subscription fees with Amazon gift card balance in the following countries: Japan, Italy, Spain, Portugal (shared site domain with Spain), Mexico, Canada, France, the United Kingdom the United States, Netherlands (since November 2023), Saudi Arabia (since November 2023), Germany (since November 2023), Luxembourg (shared site domain with Germany).

In Saudi Arabia and Mexico, users can pay for a Prime membership using only Amazon Gift Cards, without having to provide a credit or debit card beforehand. A free trial is not provided if there is no credit or debit card added to a user's account.

The ability to pay for Amazon Prime with Amazon gift card balance was removed in India in late 2024/2025.

== Competition ==
The success of Prime has spurred brick-and-mortar businesses to launch similar paid subscription programs, with Walmart with its Walmart+ program being the most notable example. Target (via Target Circle 360) and Kroger (via Kroger Boost, as well as other Boost programs branded with Kroger's various brands) also have paid subscription programs similar to Prime.

== See also ==
- List of Amazon brands
- List of Amazon products and services
- List of Amazon Video original programming
