= Amazon Drive =

Cloud storage application

- Company type: Division
- Website type: File hosting service
- Dissolved: December 31, 2023; 2 years ago
- Headquarters: United States
- Area served: United States, United Kingdom, Japan, Germany, Spain, France, Italy, Australia, Canada, Brazil, China
- Industry: Internet
- Parent: Amazon.com
- Website: www.amazon.com/clouddrive
- Registration: Required
- Launched: March 29, 2011; 15 years ago
- Current status: Discontinued

Amazon Drive, formerly known as Amazon Cloud Drive, was a cloud storage application managed by Amazon. The service offered secure cloud storage, file backup, file sharing, and Photo printing. Using an Amazon account, the files and folders could be transferred and managed from multiple devices, including web browsers, desktop applications, mobiles, and tablets. Amazon Drive also let their U.S. users order photo prints and photo books using the Amazon Prints service.

Amazon Drive offered free unlimited photo storage with an Amazon Prime subscription or a Fire Tablet device, and a paid limited storage service. Launched in major countries including the U.S., Canada, Germany, France, Italy, Spain, the U.K., Japan, and Australia, it also functioned in Brazil and China as a free limited 5GB storage service.

On July 29, 2022, Amazon announced that the service would be discontinued on December 31, 2023, whereas Amazon Photos is continued.

== History ==
Amazon first announced the storage service on March 29, 2011, initially offering pay-as-you-need tiered storage plans for the users. Users paid only for the storage tier they utilized expandable up to a maximum of 1 terabyte plan.

In March 2015, Unlimited Storage plans intended for non-business customer sections were introduced. The plan offered a free 3-month free trial for the customers who wish to try the service before entering an annual subscription. During 2015 Black Friday, the plan became popular when Amazon offered 92% discounted Unlimited Storage plan for $5, down from $60, for a year from purchase. The fine print stated that Unlimited Storage was "only for private use", was restricted by file type, and must not "substantially exceed or differ from normal use by other users". Amazon anytime "may impose other restrictions on use of the Service".

In June 2017, Amazon reverted the unlimited storage plans in the US.

On 15 November 2017, Amazon removed the unlimited storage plans for customers in Canada as well.

== Storage Plans ==
As of July 2019, Amazon offers two plans in their marketplaces: Prime Photos (since November 2014) and free limited file storage in Brazil and China only.

=== Prime Photos ===
The Prime Photos plan offers unlimited storage for photos and RAW files, and a 5 gigabytes of storage for videos and other files. Photos can be uploaded to Amazon Drive with iOS or Android apps, Kindle device, or the Cloud Drive website. Additionally, users of Kindle Fire tablets also get the plan's benefits along with the purchase of device. Their photos and videos will automatically backup from device to the Amazon Drive's cloud storage. According to Amazon, Prime Photos is only available for personal, non-commercial use and can't be used in conjunction with a photography business. Full resolution photo formats and RAW files can be uploaded, but most Raw formats won't be viewable within the service's web interface or apps.

=== Free 5GB ===
Brazil and China have Amazon Drive service but is limited to 5GB storage only. This storage counts the space taken by photos, videos, and files of other types. For customers in these countries, Amazon Drive doesn't offer an expansion plan, neither tier-based nor unlimited, to store media files exceeding the limited 5GB.

=== Country support ===
Country	Prime Photos	Unlimited Storage	Free 5GB	Amazon Prints
U.S.	Yes	Until June 2017	Since June 2017	Yes
Canada	Yes	Until November 15, 2017	Since November 15, 2017	Yes
U.K., Germany, France, Italy, Spain	Yes	Yes	No	No
Japan	Yes	Yes	No	No
Australia	No	Yes	No	No
Brazil	No	No	Yes	No
China	No	No	Yes	No
India	Yes	No	Yes	No

== Supported devices ==
=== Web ===
The service is supported on almost all types of devices ranging from PCs to mobiles. The web application is supported in common web browsers including Internet Explorer, Firefox, Safari and Google Chrome. One can create folders to organize files, rename files, move them around, and so forth. The application handle photos better than files. From the Web app, photos and videos can be viewed and played, whereas files are not viewable. By default, the images are sorted by the date they were taken. The photos include basic metadata such as filename, capture date, added date, filesize, and pixel dimension.

=== Desktop ===
Amazon Drive has released a desktop application supported for both Mac and Windows designed as a drop panel allowing users to drag and drop their files to initiate uploading. Users will have to install the application on their PC or Mac to use the application. It supports a one-touch button for downloading all the files from cloud should they be restored. Notably, files above 2GB can only be uploaded to Amazon Drive by the desktop clients. During bulk upload, files and folders can be paused or cancelled while in progress.

=== Mobile ===
Amazon Drive offers free smartphone application for iOS and Android mobile devices. The mobile application does everything on the Web and in addition automatically backs up and upload all the media files in the mobile device to the cloud. Amazon's proprietary devices, Kindle Fire and Fire Phone, ship with free unlimited photo storage which similarly backs up the photos files in the tablet to Amazon Drive.

== Features ==
=== Amazon Prints ===
In September 2016, Amazon Drive has launched Amazon Prints in U.S. through which users can edit their photos to order prints and photo books from the application. Once ordered, Amazon will ship the print orders to the customer's address similar to other retail orders.

=== Multilingual support ===
As the service is available in major Amazon Marketplaces, the applications are supported in multiple languages for usage in different countries. Popular languages that are supported are regional variations of English, Spanish, French, Italian, Portuguese, Simplified Chinese, and Japanese.

=== Digital media players ===
Amazon Drive is also built into Amazon Fire TV and Amazon Video application in other media players and Smart TVs. Having these devices, users can browse their personal photos and videos on large TV screens or view them as a slideshow.

== Limitations ==
Prime Photo users can upload an unlimited number of picture file formats only, and rest of the formats including video formats will be counted in the additional 5GB storage in the plan. If additional files exceeding 5GB need to be stored, one can opt for one of the paid plans depending on the country. In the unlimited plans, files above 2GB are restricted from uploading to the application. The desktop application however, is exempted from uploading files greater than 2GB in size. Amazon Drive streaming is not available for videos longer than 20 minutes or larger than 2 GB, but these can be stored in Amazon Drive to download and watch offline. Unlike other popular file hosting services, Amazon Drive does not offer file-syncing or automatic backup in Web, so users cannot have the latest desktop version of all their documents and images. Also, shared documents cannot be collaborated with others, but can only be downloaded for editing. However, mobile applications support automatic backup capabilities.

The service limits the usage for personal and non-commercial use. One may not use it to store, transfer or distribute the content of or on behalf of third parties, to operate own file storage application or service, to operate a photography business or other commercial service.

== See also ==
- Amazon Prime
- Comparison of file hosting services
- List of Amazon products and services
