= Private label =

Brand made by one firm, offered by another

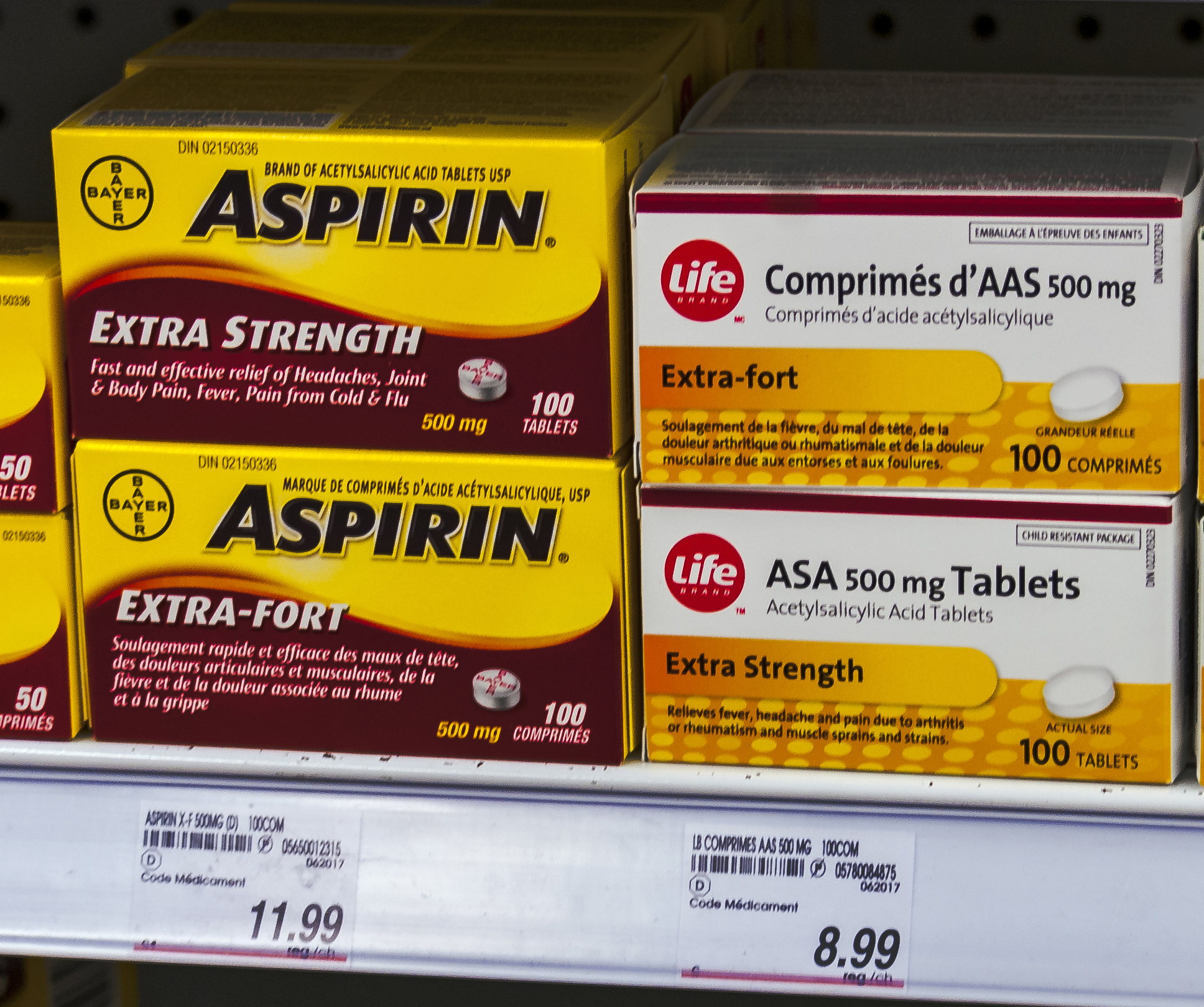
Two brands of aspirin. Left: a national brand made by Bayer. Right: a private-label brand. Note the price difference and similar boxes.

A private label, also called a private brand or private-label brand, is a brand owned by a company that directly sells the product, but outsources the manufacturing to a third party. That is, one company makes a product for another company which then offers the product under its brand name. Among the best-known private-label brands are store brands, brands owned by and sold exclusively at a particular retailer, such as a supermarket or grocery store chain. Examples are Simple Truth by Kroger and Great Value by Walmart. Store brands compete with national brands. Manufacturers of private-label goods are usually anonymous, sometimes by contract. In other cases, they are allowed to mention their role publicly.

A private-label product is similar to but distinct from a white-label one. A private-label product is made by a manufacturer exclusively for one client, who sets the product specifications, while for a white-label product, the manufacturer determines specifications and may make exactly the same thing for multiple clients, with each client selling the product under its own brand.

== Store brands ==
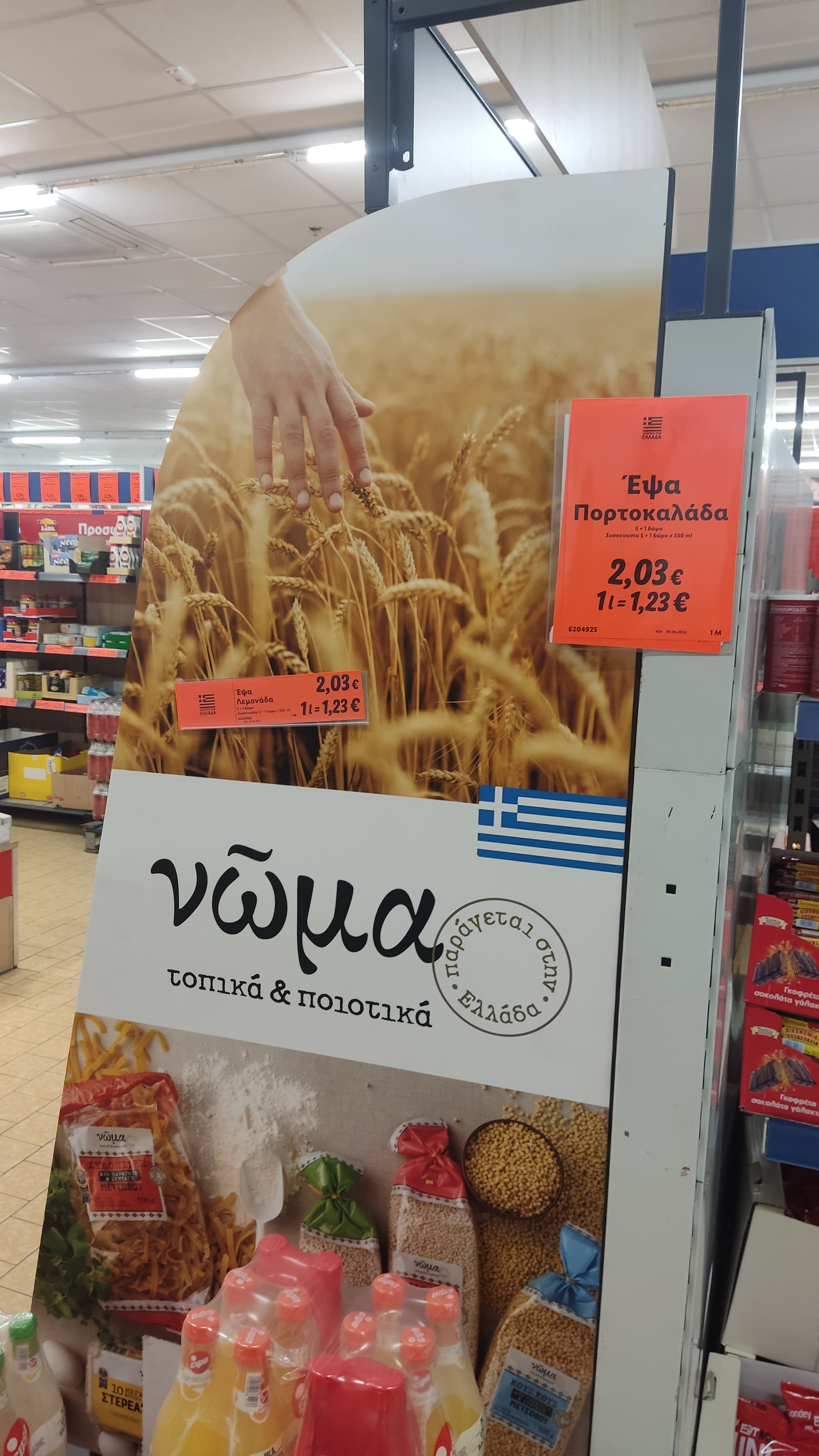
νώμα (noma, "remembrance, memory"), a private-label trademark of Lidl for its Greek branch. Around 80% of the products in a Lidl store are private labels.

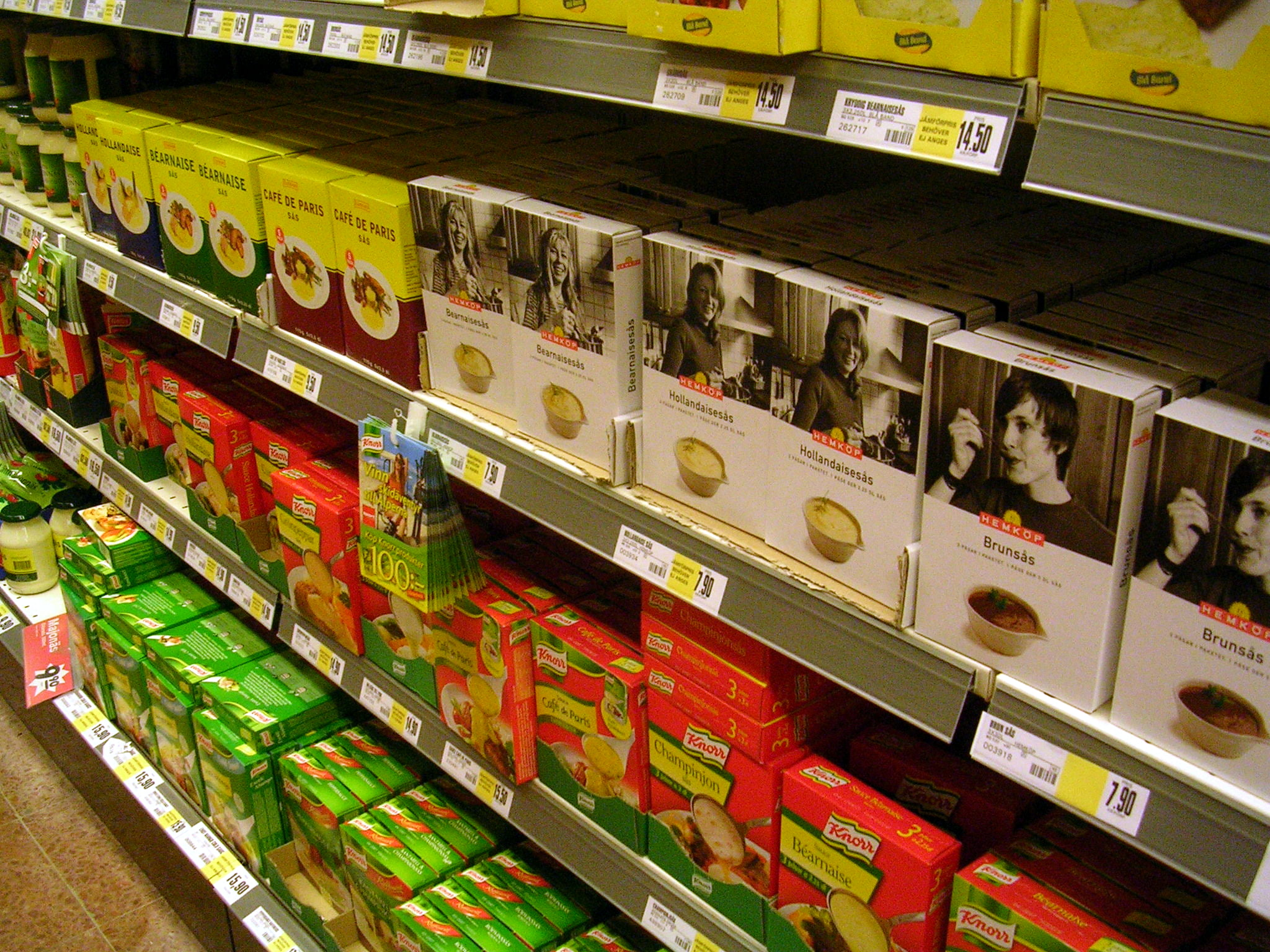
Shelves in a Swedish grocery store showing both private label and international brands

In the supermarket and grocery store industry, a store brand is also called a house brand or own brand, and is almost always offered exclusively at the chain store that owns it; in rare instances, however, the brand is licensed to another company.

Examples of store brands are Simple Truth by Kroger, Great Value by Walmart, Clover Valley by Dollar General, Market Pantry by Target, and Specially Selected by Aldi. Store brands can also be eponymous, with Amazon Basics being an example. Other stores with large selections of private brands include JCPenney and Macy's.

Store brands compete with national brands, also called premium brands or name brands. The general appeal of store-brand products is that they are usually offered at a lower price than their name-brand counterparts.

Most private-label store brand products are manufactured by third parties, but companies owned by the retailer make some. For instance, a vice president of The Kroger Company stated in 2018 that approximately 60% of their private-label products are outsourced. The remaining 40% is manufactured internally: in 2018, Kroger owned 38 plants, including 19 dairy farms, 10 bakeries, and 2 butcheries, strategically spread across the US. Similarly, Safeway Inc. owned 32 plants as of 2012. Most retailers prefer to keep the identity of their suppliers private, and accordingly have non-disclosure clauses in their contracts, making it difficult to determine the producer of a private-label product. In a few cases though, the manufacturer is allowed to mention it publicly, is revealed through a product recall, or in rare instances, is stated on the product itself. For example, the bags of Kirkland Signature coffee by Costco feature the text "Custom roasted by Starbucks".

A private-label brand is often produced by the same company that manufactures the national brand of the product. Different brands target different consumers. For instance, Kimberly-Clark makes Huggies diapers, but also produces a Walmart budget version. Allegedly, some store-brand items are identical to their name-brand counterparts: they are said to be literally the same product, except for the packaging and price. In other cases, a manufacturer can have multiple formulas for one product, creating a private-label version using one method and the national-label version using another. In 2007, a mass-recall of contaminated pet food products brought to light that more than 100 different brands of pet food, both premium- and private-label, were in fact produced by a single company: Menu Foods Inc. in Ontario, Canada. The ingredients and recipes they used differed substantially among brands, depending on what their clients specified.

=== History ===
Private-label brands emerged in the 19th century. Until the early 20th century, their general focus was on delivering quality at a price below that of the national brands. In the first half of the 20th century, the quality of private brands diluted and their standards dropped. In their competitive struggle against national brands, low prices were considered more important than quality. In the second half of the century, this trend gradually reversed. As quality and visual appearance improved, private labels rose to prominence in the 1970s and '80s. By the 1990s, they were increasingly seen as a threat to the established brands. Also, from the 1990s onwards, a premiumization of store brands began to occur, giving rise to more expensive premium private labels. A survey conducted by the UK's Groceries Code Adjudicator in 2024 noted that retailers were introducing more own-label products and the adjudicator commented that this trend added to management complexities for suppliers.

Generic brands are often associated with store brands. Generic products were first introduced in the United States in 1977, quickly winning market share from national and private-label brands. A 1981 academic article described them as products "without brand names, in very plain packages with simple labels and usually sold at prices below both the national and private brands with which they compete". Packages of generic products often feature only the name of the type of product it contains, e.g. "Cola" or "Batteries". Nowadays, the terms generic brand and store brand are sometimes used interchangeably. The term generic can be used as a pejorative toward store brand items that are perceived as bland or cheap.

== In finance ==
A private-label credit card (PLCC) is a type of credit card that can only be used at a specific company or chain of companies. Since this is virtually always a retail business, they are also called store cards. The retailer partners with a bank that issues the cards, funds the credit, and collects payments from customers. The cards themselves are branded with the logo of the store, but not the bank. Examples are the Target Circle Card (formerly Target RedCard) (issued by TD Bank, N.A.), the Walmart Reward Card (issued by Capital One), and the Amazon Store Card (issued by Synchrony Bank). PLCCs also do not carry the logo of the payment network (e.g. Visa or Mastercard), but they do use that network for transactions.

Private-label store credit cards are sometimes compared to, but are not the same as, co-branded credit cards. These cards usually feature the payment network logo and, in some cases, the bank's logo. Unlike PLCCs, co-branded cards work like 'normal' credit cards, usable at any place where that type of card is accepted. For instance, warehouse chain Nordstrom offers a Nordstrom Store Card (private label) and a Nordstrom Credit Card (co-branded), both issued by TD Bank, N.A. and using Visa's network.

== See also ==
- Contract packager
- Ghost developer
- Ghost writer
- List of Amazon brands
- List of Target brands
- List of Walmart brands
- Rebadging
