= List of Amazon brands =

Amazon offers multiple lines of privately labeled products. These are available on Amazon.com, Amazon Fresh, Prime Pantry, Prime Now, Amazon Go, and Whole Foods Market. Amazon houses its in-house brand offerings under the “Our Brands” label, which is separate from exclusive brands. Exclusive brand items are third party offerings sold exclusively through Amazon. Some of Amazon's store brands require an Amazon Prime membership to purchase.

== Pinzon ==
In August 2005, Amazon began selling products under its own private label, Pinzon. The trademark applications indicated that the label would be used for textiles, kitchen utensils, and other household goods. In March 2007, the company applied to expand the trademark to cover a more diverse list of goods. The brand was officially launched in 2009. Along with AmazonBasics, it was Amazon's first in-house brand. In September 2008, Amazon filed to have the name registered. USPTO has finished its review of the application and it was officially granted in 2016.

== Amazon Basics ==
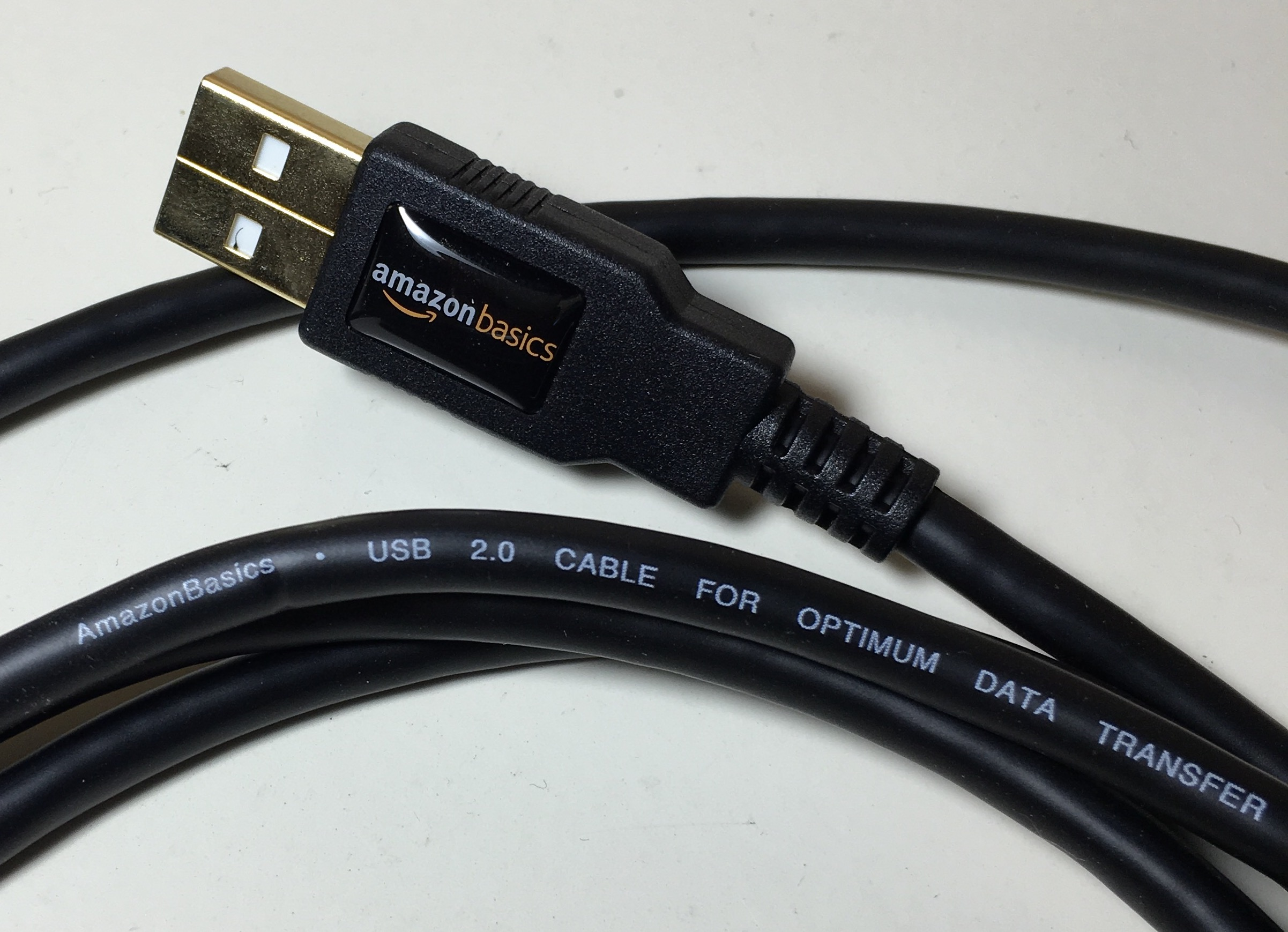
AmazonBasics branded USB cable

Amazon Basics (formerly written as AmazonBasics) is a private label that offers home goods, office supplies, and tech accessories. The line was launched in 2009. As of December 2017, Amazon Basics is the best-selling private label brand on Amazon.com. In November 2018, AmazonBasics expanded their product line to include home improvement items, offering kitchen and bath hardware. In December 2018, the company launched five initial AmazonBasics toy listings pages. Plans to expand the private label to include toys had not been confirmed by Amazon.

== solimo ==
After AmazonBasics, the company came up with another private-label called solimo which offers kitchen and home goods primarily. Apart from these, Solimo overlaps with AmazonBasics when it comes to mobile and other electronics accessories. As of February 2019, the Indian Government has placed heavy restrictions on the sale of Solimo and AmazonBasics due to possible antitrust breaches.

== Amazon Elements ==
In 2014, Amazon launched Amazon Elements, a line of domestic products including baby wipes and (formerly) diapers. In 2017, the brand introduced a line of vitamins and supplements.

== Wag ==
Introduced in May 2018, Wag is a Prime-exclusive brand of dog food. The brand's name and logo were derived from Wag.com, which was acquired by Amazon and later shut down.

== Mama Bear ==
The private label Mama Bear sells baby wipes, baby food, diaper pail refills and baby laundry detergent. In 2018, the brand began selling newborn through size six diapers, which were previously offered by the Amazon Elements private brand before their removal from the site in 2014.

== Food and beverages ==
=== Wickedly Prime ===
In early 2018, Amazon launched a line of snack foods under the name Wickedly Prime only available to Amazon Prime members in the United States.

=== 365 ===
365 is the store brand at Whole Foods Market, which was acquired by Amazon in 2017. The brand consists of grocery items and household essentials, many of which are organic or produced without genetic engineering. Following Amazon's acquisition of Whole Foods, the non-perishable 365-brand products became available on Amazon's site in the United States, United Kingdom, and Canada.

=== Amazon Fresh ===
Amazon Fresh is a private label grocery delivery service that allows users to order groceries and household goods for delivery. Grocery pickup services are also available in some locations. The brand was introduced in 2017. The service is available in several US states, Tokyo, Berlin, Hamburg and central/eastern London. In India, Amazon Fresh is available in some cities such as Mumbai, Delhi, Noida, Gurgaon, Thane, Vashi, Ahmedabad, Jaipur, Pune, Bangalore, Mysore, Chennai, Hyderabad and Kolkata.

=== Happy Belly ===
Happy Belly is an Amazon private label that sells snack food items. It was introduced in 2016 and first include packaged nuts and granola mixes. In February 2019, the brand expanded to include milk delivery service.

=== Amazon Essentials ===
On October 1, 2025, Amazon announced that more than 1,000 food items formerly sold as Amazon Fresh and Happy Belly will now be Amazon Essentials.

=== Amazon Saver ===
Amazon Saver is a brand of grocery items that was introduced in 2024 to compete with other brands such as Aldi.

=== Vedaka ===
Vedaka is a brand of Amazon India for groceries, spices, pulses, lentils, flours, teas, grains, oils, dry fruits and such everyday items.

== Apparel ==
=== Amazon Essentials ===
Amazon Essentials is a clothing line of basic wear for men, women, baby, and kids, with additional options for family, big and tall, and athletic activity, competing with Walmart, Target, Uniqlo, H&M and likes own clothing labels.

== See also ==
- List of Target brands
- List of Walmart brands
