= Chamberlain Group =

American perimeter control equipment manufacturer

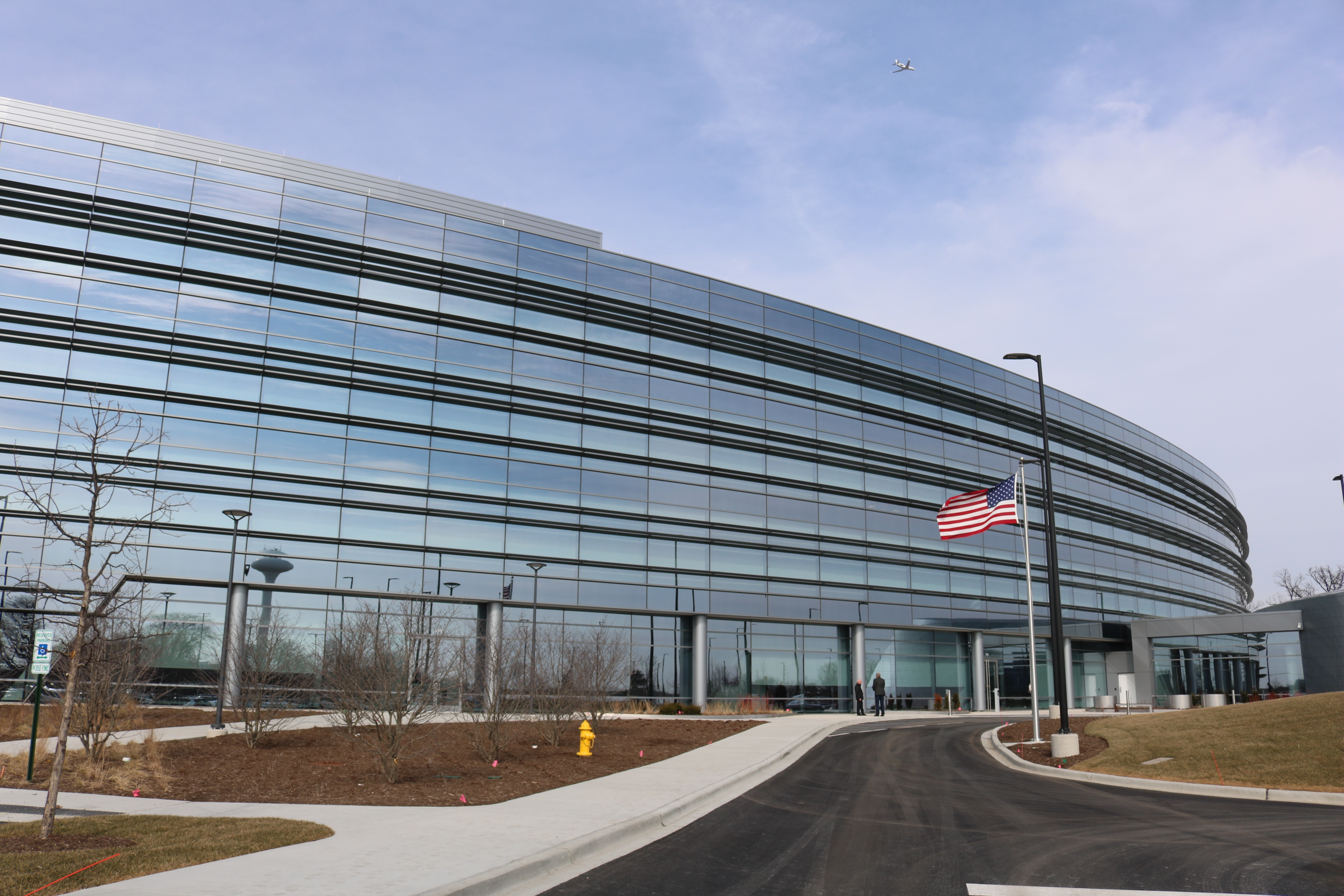
- Chamberlain's global headquarters
- Type: Subsidiary
- Industry: Perimeter Access
- Founded: 1954
- Headquarters: Oak Brook, Illinois, U.S.,
- Area served: Worldwide
- Parent: Blackstone
- Website: www.chamberlaingroup.com

Chamberlain Group (CGI) is an American manufacturer of perimeter access control equipment. The company is the parent organization of brands including LiftMaster, Chamberlain, Merlin, and Grifco, and develops residential garage door openers, commercial door operators, security systems, and related technologies. As of 2025, the company’s brands collectively held a significant share of the garage door opener market in the United States.

CGI is also the parent company of Controlled Products Systems Group, a wholesale distributor of perimeter access control equipment in the United States. In 2021, The Duchossois Group sold Chamberlain Group to Blackstone Inc.

== Products ==
The company develops the myQ smart access platform, which enables remote monitoring and control of garage doors and connected devices through mobile applications and Wi-Fi network integration. The platform supports features such as remote access, activity monitoring, and integration with selected third-party services.The myQ platform enables users to monitor and control garage doors remotely through a mobile application and connected smart garage devices. In 2019, Chamberlain announced integration with Amazon Key, allowing delivery personnel to place packages inside garages using compatible devices.

== Controversy ==
In November 2023, the company restricted third-party access to its myQ platform following earlier changes to integrations with external smart home systems. The update affected compatibility with certain third-party applications and open-source platforms. Subsequent reporting noted that these changes limited interoperability with external devices and services. In December 2025, Chamberlain Group left the Connectivity Standards Alliance, the organization responsible for the Matter smart home standard. Subsequent updates further limited compatibility with certain third-party controllers and integrations.
