= Fire HDX =

Tablet computer by Amazon

Amazon Fire HDX Kindle Fire HDX
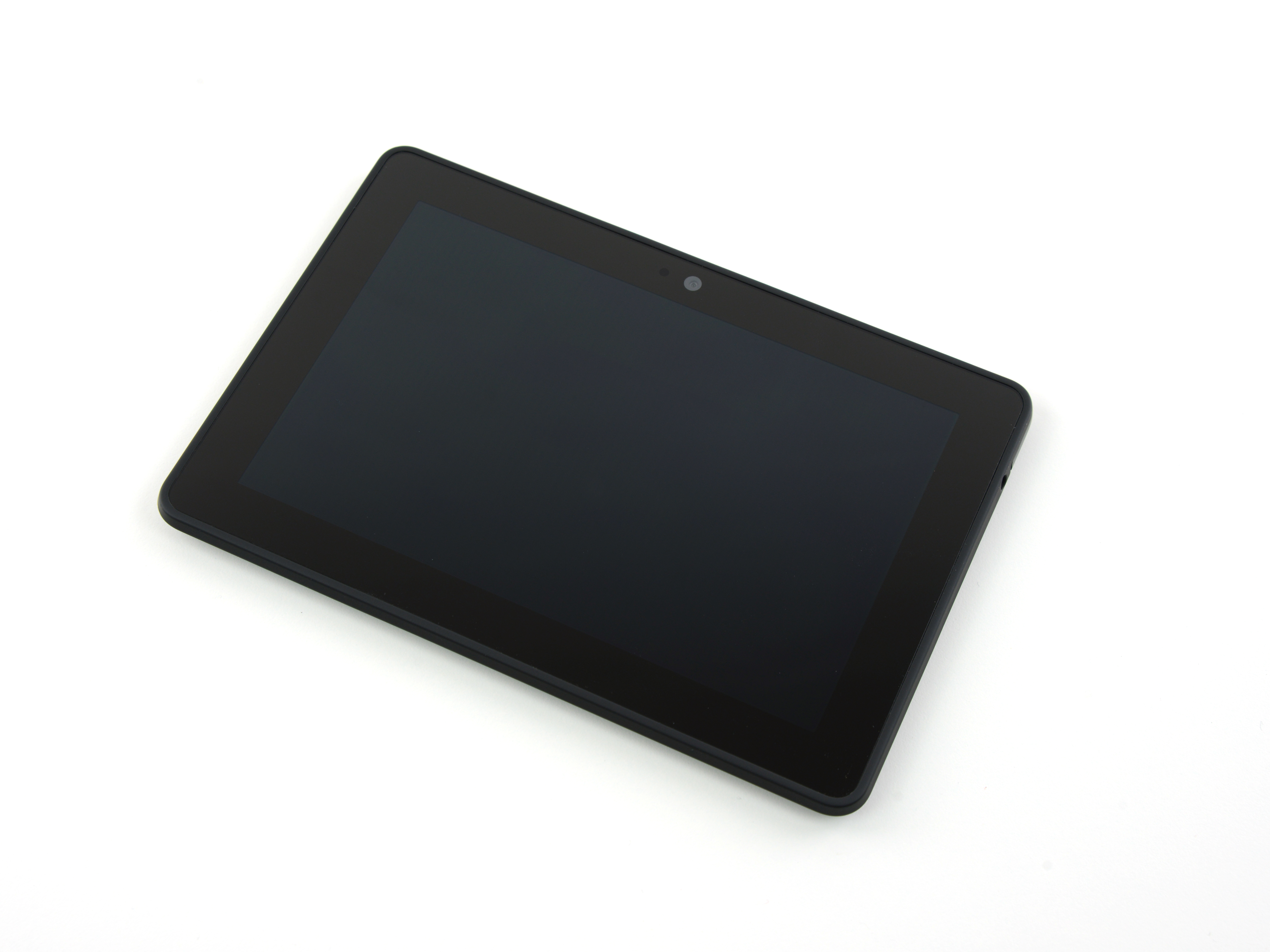
- Fire HDX 7 (3rd gen, 2013)
- Developer: Amazon
- Type: Tablet computer
- Released: October 18, 2013 (7" model); November 7, 2013 (8.9" model) (USA)
- Operating system: Fire OS 3, upgradable to Fire OS 5
- System on a chip: Qualcomm Snapdragon 800
- CPU: Quad-core 2.2 GHz ARM Krait 400
- Memory: 2 GB
- Storage: 16/32/64 GB
- Display: 7" model: 1920 × 1200 px 323 PPI; 7 in (18 cm) diagonal 8.9" model: 2560 × 1600 px 339 PPI; 8.9 in (23 cm) diagonal
- Graphics: Adreno 330
- Sound: Stereo speakers
- Input: GPS, accelerometer, gyroscope, light sensor
- Camera: Front; 8.9" model only: 8 MP Rear
- Connectivity: Micro-USB 2.0 (type B); 3.5 mm stereo socket Dual-band 802.11 a/b/g/n WiFi; 4G LTE; Bluetooth 4.0
- Online services: Amazon Prime, Amazon Cloud Storage, Amazon Cloud Player, Amazon video, Amazon Silk, Amazon Appstore, Amazon Kindle Store
- Dimensions: 7" model: 186 mm × 128 mm × 9.0 mm (7.32 in × 5.04 in × 0.35 in); 8.9" model: 231 mm × 158 mm × 7.8 mm (9.09 in × 6.22 in × 0.31 in)
- Weight: 7" model: WiFi 303 g, 4G 311 g 8.9" model: WiFi 374 g, 4G 384 g
- Related: Fire HD
- Website: Amazon Kindle Fire HDX

The Amazon Fire HDX, formerly named Kindle Fire HDX, is a high-end model in the Amazon Fire line of tablet computers. It was announced on September 25, 2013, and was available in two models, 7 inch and 8.9 inch. The 7 inch WiFi model was released on October 18, 2013, and the 8.9 inch WiFi model was released on November 7, 2013, in the United States.

In September 2014, Amazon released the second generation of the Fire HDX 8.9 model that has a faster processor and a more powerful graphics processing unit. In addition, the name "Kindle" was removed from all of the Fire tablets' names.

The Fire HDX tablets were discontinued, and the Fire HD tablet line now included the most powerful versions of Amazon Fire devices.

On October 8, 2026, Amazon announced the Amazon Alexa Tablets, to replace the entire Fire tablet brand lineup. The new devices are a return to more premium and powerful hardware after Amazon had left the mid-tier and high-end market with the discontinuation of the Fire HDX line more than a decade prior.

== Design ==
=== Hardware ===
Both the 2013 7 inch and 8.9 inch LCD models contain a Qualcomm Snapdragon 800 processor that has an Adreno 330 GPU. The models also have a 1.2 megapixel front camera that shoots 720p HD video. The 8.9 inch model has an 8 megapixel rear camera that shoots HD 1080p video. The exterior surface has angular, raised plastic edges with the power and volume buttons located on the backside. The Fire HDX features Dolby Digital Plus audio engine powering the two attached speakers. A normal user will get about 12 hours of battery life from a full charge.

The Fire HDX 8.9" refresh in 2014 uses a Qualcomm Snapdragon 805 processor with an Adreno 420 GPU. The sound system features Dolby Atmos speaker technology and the Wi-Fi version weighs 13.2 ounces (370 grams).

=== Software ===
Both 2013 models shipped with Fire OS 3 which is a proprietary fork of Android 4.2.2. It features "Mayday", a button for free tech support available any time, "Silk", a cloud-accelerated browser, the Amazon Appstore for games and apps and Amazon.com services for media content purchases. The tablets can send video content to a supported TV, game console or through a device like a Wireless Display HDMI adapter wirelessly using "Second Screen", but cannot send content via a HDMI cable like its predecessor, the Kindle Fire HD.

The 2014 refresh uses Fire OS 4 "Sangria", which features profiles so each user on the tablet can have their own settings and apps.

After Fire OS 5 was released on new 2015 Fire tablet models it was also made available as an over-the-air upgrade for 4th gen Fire tablets, including the 2014 HDX 8.9. Amazon provided a downgrade mechanism for users who did not like the upgrade.

==== Mayday feature ====
Sascha Segan of PC Magazine mentioned: "Press the Mayday button, and within 15 seconds, a live Amazon operator appears in a video chat window on your screen to answer all of your Kindle Fire questions. He or she will even tell you what apps to download. I've never seen anything else like it on a tablet." In his review of the Kindle Fire HDX 7" he called the Mayday remote video support feature as "revolutionary" and "Amazon's most exciting feature".

In June 2018, however, Amazon "quietly" discontinued the Mayday feature.

==== Fire OS UI ====
The Fire HDX's UI has a "Carousel" which contains the most recent apps used and ones that have been updated or purchased recently. The Carousel also holds documents, videos, music, and books. The Fire HDX also has a favorites tab in which the user can access the users apps from any other application.

== Models ==
Overview on generations and models for all Fire tablet devices:

Display Size (Diag.) Generation (Year)	6 in	7 in	8 in	8.9 in	10.1 in	11 in
1st (2011)		Kindle Fire				
2nd (2012)		Kindle Fire; Kindle Fire HD				
2.5th (2012)				Kindle Fire HD WiFi; Kindle Fire HD WAN		
3rd (2013)		Kindle Fire; Kindle Fire HD WiFi; Kindle Fire HD WAN	Kindle Fire HD WiFi; Kindle Fire HD WAN			
4th (2014)	Fire HD	Fire HD		Fire HDX WiFi; Fire HDX WAN		
5th (2015)		Fire 7	Fire HD 8		Fire HD 10	
6th (2016)			Fire HD 8			
7th (2017)		Fire 7	Fire HD 8		Fire HD 10	
8th (2018)			Fire HD 8			
9th (2019)		Fire 7			Fire HD 10	
10th (2020)			Fire HD 8 Fire HD 8+			
11th (2021)					Fire HD 10; Fire HD 10+	
12th (2022)		**Fire 7**	Fire HD 8 Fire HD 8+			
13th (2023)					**Fire HD 10**	**Fire Max 11**
12th (2024)			**Fire HD 8**			

Note: Items in bold are currently available.

Detailed specifications for all Fire HDX tagged tablet devices:

Generation (within Fire tablets*)		3rd Generation (2013)		4th Generation (2014)
Model		Kindle Fire HDX (7")	Kindle Fire HDX 8.9"	Fire HDX 8.9
Code name		Thor	Apollo	Saturn
Modelnumber		KFTHWA (WAN); KFTHWI (Wi-Fi)	KFAPWA (WAN); KFAPWI (Wi-Fi)	KFSAWA (WAN); KFSAWI (Wi-Fi)
Release date	Wi-Fi	October 18, 2013	November 7, 2013	October 21, 2014
Release date	+Cellular	November 14, 2013	December 10, 2013	December 2014
Status		Discontinued	Discontinued	Discontinued
OS		Fire OS 4 (or 3.2)		Fire OS 5 (or 4.5.2)
Fire OS (latest)		4.5.5.3		5.6.7.0
Screen	Size (diagonal)	7 in (18 cm)	8.9 in (23 cm)	
Screen	Resolution	1920 × 1200	2560 × 1600	
Screen	Density	323 ppi	339 ppi	
CPU	Maker	Qualcomm		
CPU	Kind	Quad-core Snapdragon		
CPU	Model	800		805
CPU	Cores	4x Krait 400 @ 2.2 GHz		4x Krait 450 @ 2.5 GHz
CPU	Width	32-bit		
GPU	Designer	Qualcomm		
GPU	Kind	Adreno		
GPU	Model	330		420
GPU	Clock	450 MHz		600 MHz
RAM		2 GiB		
Storage	Internal	16 GB, 32 GB, or 64 GB		
Storage	External	—N/a		
Camera	Back	—N/a	8 MP	
Camera	Front	1.2 MP HD 720p still and video camera		
Microphone		Yes		
Bluetooth		BT 4.0 + EDR (HID and A2DP profiles only)		
Wireless	Wi-Fi	Dual-band 802.11 a/b/g/n		Dual-band 802.11 a/b/g/n/ac MIMO + HT80
Wireless	+Cellular	adds 4G LTE		
Location	Wi-Fi	Wi-Fi based		
Location	+Cellular	adds GPS and aGPS		
Proximity	Wi-Fi	—N/a		
Proximity	+Cellular	Yes		—N/a
Compass	Wi-Fi	—N/a		
Compass	+Cellular	Yes		
Light sensor		Yes		
Accelerometer		Yes		
Gyroscope		Yes		
Barometer		—N/a		
Weight	Wi-Fi	303 g (10.7 oz)	374 g (13.2 oz)	375 g (13.2 oz)
Weight	+Cellular	311 g (11.0 oz)	384 g (13.5 oz)	389 g (13.7 oz)
Dimensions		186 mm × 128 mm × 9.0 mm (7.32 in × 5.04 in × 0.35 in)	231 mm × 158 mm × 7.8 mm (9.09 in × 6.22 in × 0.31 in)	
Battery		4500 mAh	Up to 12 hours	
Legend: Unsupported Supported **Latest version**

The Model number consists of three parts: first the KF prefix for 'Kindle Fire', second one or two letters derived from the code name, third WI for Wi-Fi or WA for cellular interface.

== Reception ==
Engadget gave the Fire HDX an 85 out of 100, saying that it may be the most compelling case for Amazon's tablet ecosystem. While advanced users may be turned off by the limited app selection, the display's gorgeous color accuracy may make the tablet a good buy for everyone else, especially Amazon Prime members.

PC Magazine gave the Amazon Kindle Fire HDX 7" (Wi-Fi) edition 4 out of 5 and rated "Excellent" while following pros were noted: "Sharp screen. Fast processor. Extremely easy to use. Amazing live tech support."

The Fire HDX's screen has high color accuracy and high pixel density at 339 PPI, and as of early 2013 was one of the highest of tablet devices commercially available. However, CNET pointed out that no Google Play access means limited app selection compared to other Android tablets and some users may be bothered by an additional $15 to remove ads on the lock screen, while ads on the home screen can be removed with a system setting.

== Timeline ==
Timeline of Amazon Fire tablet models

Disclaimer: The discontinuation dates may not be precise.

== See also ==
- Tablet computers
- E-book readers
