= Index of Android OS articles =

This page is a list of Android-related topics.

== A ==
Android – Android Auto – Android Debug Bridge – Android Developer Lab – Android Open Accessory Development Kit – Android software development – Android version history – Android application package – Android Things – Android TV

== B ==
Bionic

== C ==
CyanogenMod – ChromeOS

== D ==
Dalvik virtual machine – Developer Challenge – Dev Phone – Droid

== F ==
Fastboot

== G ==
Google Assistant – Google Developers – Google Duo – Google Maps – Google Nexus – Google Pixel – Google TV - GrapheneOS

== K ==
Kindle OS

== L ==
List of Android app stores – List of Android games – List of Android smartphones – List of custom Android distributions – List of free and open-source Android applications

== O ==
OpenBinder – Open Handset Alliance

== P ==
Paranoid Android

== R ==
Remix OS – Replicant – RenderScript (deprecated) – Rooting

== U ==
Ubuntu for Android

== W ==
Wear OS
