= GDL =

GDL may refer to:

== Computing ==
- Game Description Language
- Generalized distributive law
- Genomics Digital Lab, a series of educational games
- Geometric Description Language
- Gesture Description Language
- GNU Data Language
- Google Developers Live

== Other uses ==
- Dirasha language
- Gas diffusion layer of a proton-exchange membrane fuel cell
- Gas Dynamics Laboratory, a Soviet rocket research and development laboratory
- Gas dynamic laser
- Gateway Distriparks, an Indian logistics company
- Gewerkschaft Deutscher Lokomotivführer, a German trade union for railway workers
- Glucono delta-lactone, a food additive
- Godley railway station, in England
- Goyim Defense League, a neo-Nazi loosely organized network of individuals
- Graduate Diploma in Law
- Graduated driver licensing
- Guadalajara International Airport, in Mexico
- Guadeloupe, ITU code
- Grand Duchy of Lithuania
