= Fire HD =

Tablet computer family by Amazon

Amazon Fire HD Kindle Fire HD
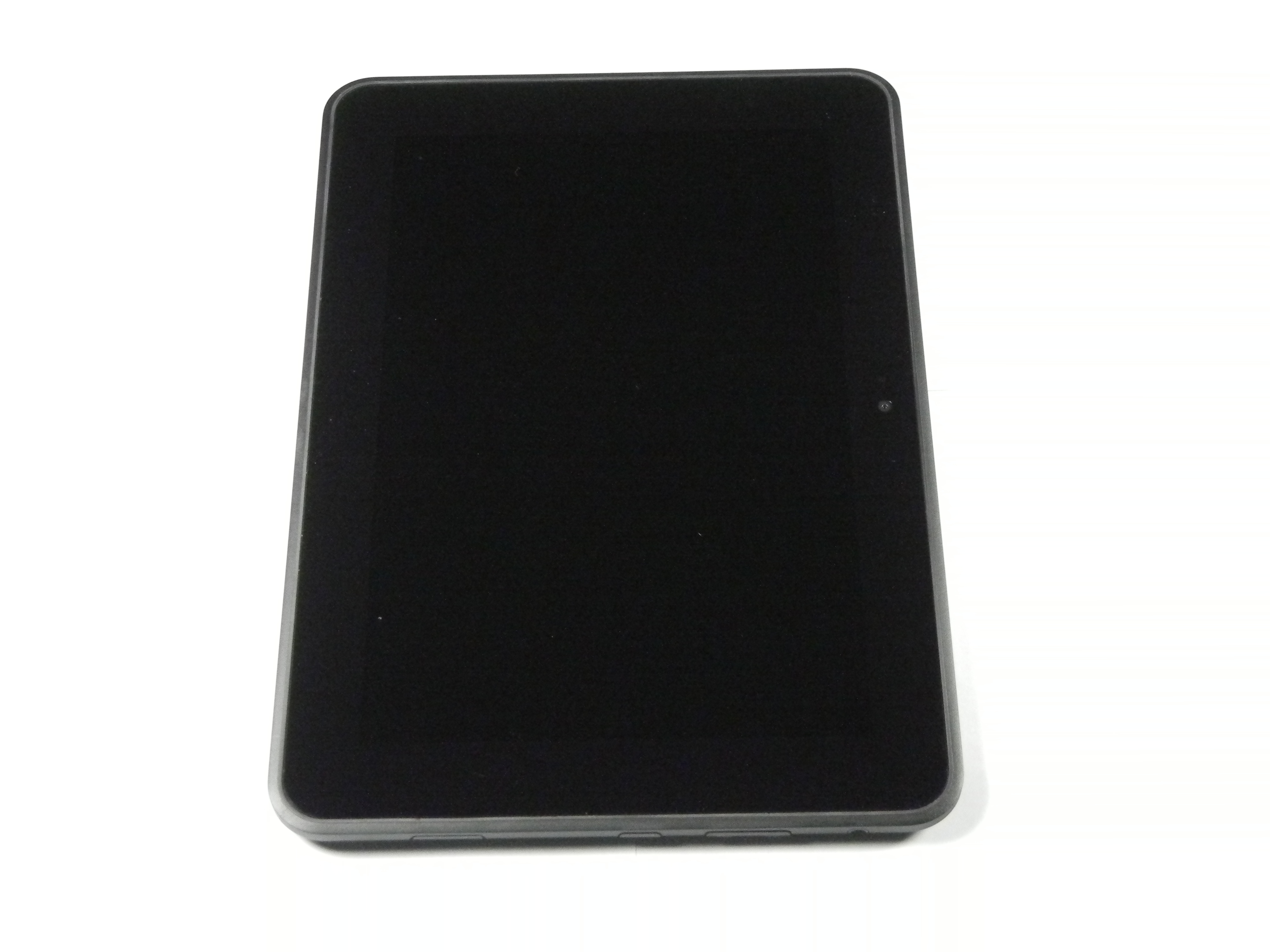
- Fire HD 8.9" (2012)
- Developer: Amazon
- Manufacturer: Quanta Computer
- Type: Tablet computer
- Operating system: Fire OS
- CPU: ARM core (see table)
- Memory: All models pre-2016 - 1 GB RAM Fire HD 8 (2016, 2017 & 2018) - 1.5 GB RAM Fire HD 10 (2017 & 2019), Fire HD 8 (2020 & 2022) - 2 GB RAM Fire HD 8 Plus (2020 & 2022), Fire HD 10 (2021 & 2023) - 3 GB RAM Fire HD 10 Plus (2021), Fire Max 11 (2023) - 4 GB RAM Fire HD 8 (2024) - 3 or 4 GB RAM
- Storage: 8–128 GB Flash (internal)
- Removable storage: MicroSDXC slot (Fire HD 8, Fire HD 10, & Fire Max 11)
- Display: 6", 7", 8", 8.9", 10.1", 11" LCD
- Sound: Stereo speakers
- Input: touchscreen
- Camera: Kindle Fire HD 7 & 8.9 (2012) - Only front facing camera Kindle Fire HD 7 (2013) - None All models 2014 and newer - Both rear and front facing cameras
- Connectivity: Micro-USB 2.0 (type B, pre-2019 models) USB-C 2.0 (2019 and newer models), USB audio on Fire Max 11 Micro-HDMI (2012 7" & 8.9" models) 3.5mm stereo jack (except Fire Max 11) 802.11 Wi-Fi 4G LTE (8.9" 2012 model) Bluetooth
- Online services: Amazon Prime, Amazon Cloud Storage, Amazon Cloud Player, Amazon video, Amazon Silk, Amazon Appstore, Amazon Kindle Store
- Predecessor: Kindle Fire
- Related: Fire HDX
- Website: Amazon Fire HD

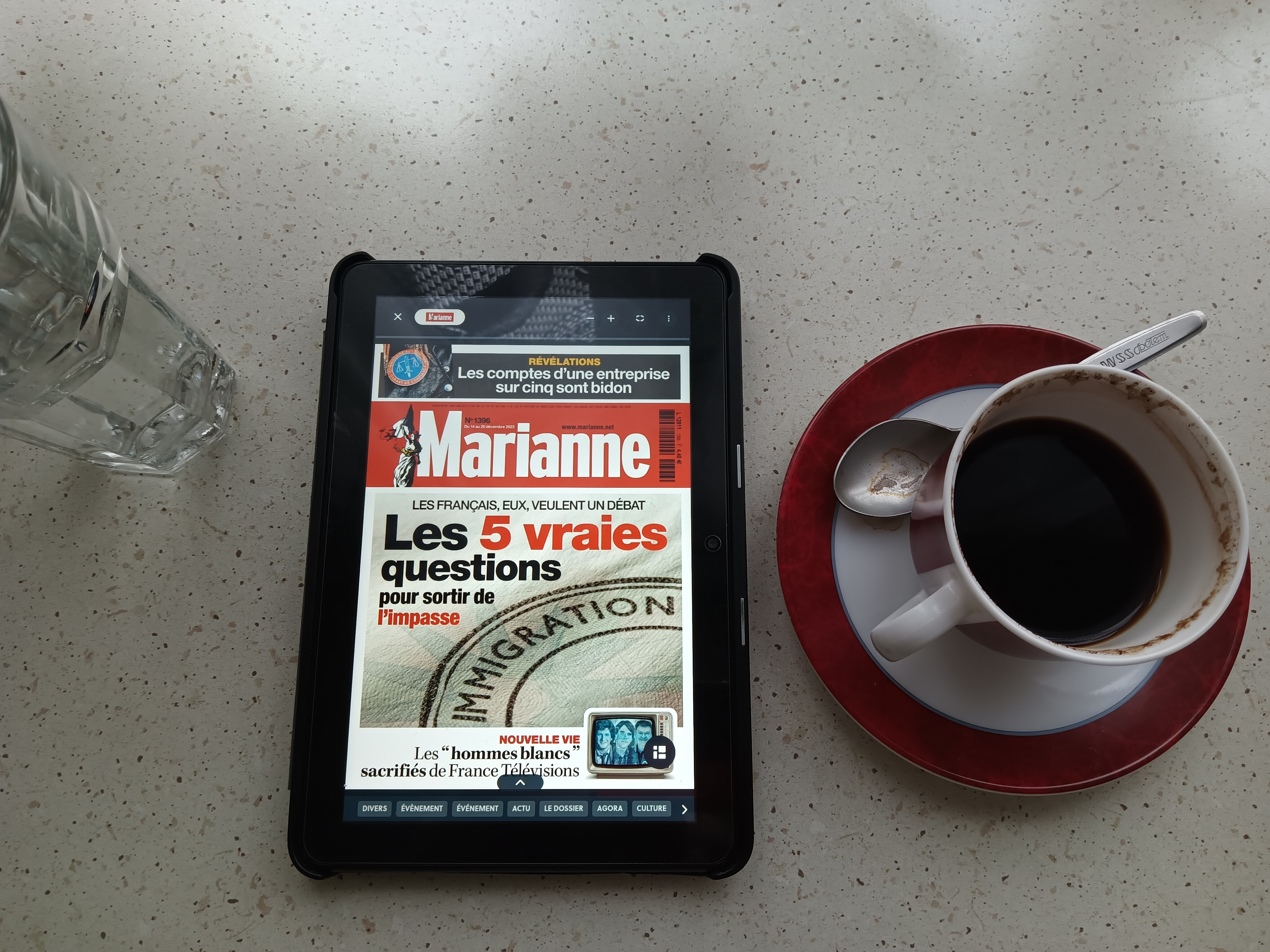
Amazon Fire HD 8 2022 (12th Generation) screen in factory settings

The Fire HD, also known as Kindle Fire HD prior to 2014, is a member of the Amazon Fire family of tablet computers. Fire HD refers to Amazon Fire family tablets with HD resolution displays. These devices run the Fire OS operating system.

== History ==
The first Fire HD model was announced on September 6, 2012, and was available in two versions: 7" and 8.9". The 7" model was released in the United States on September 14, France, Germany, Italy, Spain and the United Kingdom on October 25 and in Japan on December 18. The 8.9" model was released on November 20 in the United States, in Japan on March 12, 2013, in Germany on March 13, and in India on June 27.

On September 25, 2013, an updated Fire HD 7 was quietly announced alongside the newly debuted flagship Kindle Fire HDX line. It was available as a pre-order until the official ship date of October 2, 2013. Changes include: price reduction to $139, processor speed upgraded to 1.5 GHz, firmware upgrade from the unnamed "Android based" OS to a compatible proprietary fork of Android named Fire OS 3, removal of the front camera, new shell form factor, and decreased available storage options.

On October 2, 2014, the next revision of Fire HD models were released, part of the Fire Tablet's fourth generation, with 6-inch and 7-inch touchscreen sizes. In addition, the Fire HD Kids Edition was released, which is the same device as the Fire HD 6 except it comes with a case and one-year subscription to Kindle Freetime apps. The branding "Kindle" was officially removed from the tablets' name.

In September 2015, Amazon released a new range of Fire tablets with 7-, 8-, and 10.1-inch sizes. The 7-inch was simply called the Fire 7, while the 8-inch and 10.1-inch were called Fire HD 8 and Fire HD 10 respectively. Amazon had ended the HDX line after two generations and the new model range shifted the entire Fire tablet line down-market, with Fire 7 as the lowest priced Fire tablet at $50.

All 4th and 5th generation Fire HD models use the same quad-core MediaTek System-on-a-Chip (SoC) with 1 GB of RAM.

In September 2016, Amazon announced the release of the updated Fire HD 8 which includes the virtual assistant Alexa, priced at US$89.99. Fortune reported that, "As with most of Amazon's devices, the aim isn't to make money off of the hardware but instead to sell digital content such as books, movies, and TV shows to users". The new model also included a faster SoC and 1.5 GB of RAM.

On June 17, 2017, the seventh Generation Fire HD 8 was released. Some differences between the 6th and 7th Generation HD 8 models were the price, the gyroscope removal, the increase of maximum SD card expansion, and the better graphics chip.

On October 11, 2017 the 7th gen Fire HD 10 was released. It included a full HD 1920 by 1200 pixel display and a faster SoC and 2 GB of RAM.

In September 2018, Amazon released a refresh of the Fire HD 8/Kids Edition. The price remained the same as last year's model with minor upgrade on the hardware where the external storage is expandable to 400 GB and the front camera was updated to 2 MP. On the software side, the 2018 model is preinstalled with Fire OS 6 that allows hands-free Alexa control.

On October 7, 2019, Amazon announced an update to the Fire HD 10 that was released on October 30, 2019. The major hardware differences compared to the previous version were replacement of microUSB with USB-C, a faster processor (upgraded from Quad-Core up to 1.8 GHz to Octa-core 2.0 GHz, which Amazon claims is 30% faster than the previous one) and battery life that is 2 hours longer than the previous generation. The screen size and price remained unchanged. A new color option, white, was also added.

In 2020, the Fire HD 8 was updated with a faster 64-bit quad-core SoC, more storage (from 16/32 GB to 32/64 GB), USB-C, brighter display, enhanced wifi fidelity, a new front camera location (for landscape video chats instead of portrait), and Fire OS 7 (based on Android 9). It came in two versions: 2 GB RAM (HD 8) and 3 GB RAM (HD 8 Plus). The 3 GB RAM version, which enabled more memory-intensive apps, was available only in US, UK, DE, and JP marketplaces.

In 2021, the Fire HD 10 was refreshed with a new front camera location (for landscape video chats instead of portrait) and slimmer side bezels, leading to a more symmetrical design. Also, wireless charging was introduced for the "HD 10 Plus" model. The HD 10 Plus also has 4 GB of RAM.

On September 20, 2022, Amazon announced an update to the HD 8 as a 12th generation model. The new model is the first to run the new Fire OS 8. It also has a faster SoC and improved battery life.

In 2023, Amazon released an all new size of Fire tablet called Fire Max 11. The device features a larger display at 11" with official USI2.0 stylus support, pogo pins for an external keyboard, and a fingerprint sensor. All Max 11 have a partially recycled aluminum rear housing instead of plastic. All are new technologies to Fire tablets. A short-lived option for an aluminum rear-housing was available for the 5th gen HD 10 and was not continued on later gens. It also features newer hardware such as a faster and more efficient octa-core SoC, 4 GB RAM, 8 MP cameras, WiFi 6, and Bluetooth 5.3 BLE. Despite the change of naming convention Amazon considers the Max 11 to be in the Fire HD series.

On September 20, 2023, Amazon held a Device & Services event where they announced two new Kids models, the HD 10 Kids and HD 10 Kids Pro. Both have an MSRP of $189.99. Older models based on the 2021 HD 10 were discounted to a sale price of $139.99 from $199.99. The product descriptions show the new models as variants of the otherwise unannounced 2023 release for the 13th gen Fire HD 10. Shortly after the event official Amazon store pages and documentation showed a new 2023 model of the HD 10 with the model number KFTUWI. It has new hardware features from the Max 11 such as active stylus and detachable keyboard support. The product page for the device listed it as a pre-order for $139.99 and to be available on October 18, 2023.

On October 2, 2024, the Fire HD 8 was refreshed with more RAM. The 2024 model is still part of the 12th generation of Fire tablets and the hardware specs are nearly identical to the 2022 Fire HD 8 Plus model. Amazon did not release a Plus model in the 2024 refresh, and the 2024 HD 8 does not gain the wireless charging feature. Instead, the HD 8 is available with 32 GB of storage and 3 GB of RAM or 64 GB of storage and 4 GB of RAM. Externally, the case colors were changed to black, emerald, and hibiscus.

On October 8, 2026, Amazon announced a new line of tablets called Amazon Alexa Tablets. They are a new series of AI-focused devices that run regular Android 16 on more capable and powerful hardware housed inside of new all-aluminum unibody chassis. Media reports claim Amazon has said they will stop shipping Fire tablets in the next couple of months. That timing coincides with Amazon's annual sales promotions on Black Friday and Cyber Monday.

== Design ==
=== Hardware ===
The Fire tablets feature multi-touch touchscreen LCD screens. The first generation 7" model contains a Texas Instruments OMAP 4460 processor, while the 8.9" model uses an OMAP 4470 processor. All three models feature Dolby audio and stereo speakers. The 7" model's speakers are dual-driver, while the 8.9" model's are single-driver. The device has two Wi-Fi antennas on the 2.4 GHz and 5 GHz bands which utilize MIMO to improve reception. The Fire HD also added Bluetooth connectivity allowing users to connect an array of wireless accessories including keyboards. The first generation models have an HDMI port, but this is missing from future generations.

In June 2016, Amazon released a version of the fifth-generation Fire HD 10 that has an aluminum exterior instead of plastic like the other Fire tablets, and is available at the same price as the plastic version.

The first Fire HD model to get an octa-core processor was the HD 10 tablet released in 2019. USB-C replaced the microUSB for charging in the HD 10 in 2019 and the HD 8 in 2020. The position of the front-facing camera was redesigned to permit landscape video chats in the HD 8 in 2020 and the HD 10 in 2021. Also higher RAM versions were released: 3 GB RAM in the HD 8 Plus in 2020 and 4 GB RAM in the HD 10 Plus in 2021.

In 2023, the introduction of the Fire Max 11 added many new features and technologies to the Fire tablet line. Most notably it included active stylus support. All previous models were limited to simple capacitive styluses that behave like a finger, without any enhanced accuracy or features that active styluses are capable of. The Max 11 also included a fingerprint sensor on the power button, as well as a special connector for an external keyboard. It was the first Fire model to ship without a 3.5 mm headphone socket, instead using USB audio over the USB-C connector.

=== Software ===
The 2012 models use software that introduced user profiles for sharing among family members and the ability to place absolute limits on total usage or usage of individual features, called FreeTime, and tracks the user's reading speed to predict when the user will finish a chapter or book. The OS is based on a version of Android 4.0.3 "Ice Cream Sandwich". This does not allow use of Google Play, limiting the number of apps accessible for the Fire HD. Fire HD software updates can be received OTA or from the support websites.

The Fire HD 7" second generation used Fire OS 3. Note that although this version is called the Fire HD 7", it is not the successor to the original Fire HD. This model is the successor to the Fire second generation. The Fire HD models second generation were updated to FireOS 4.1.1, based on Android 4.4.4, in Q3 2014.

The Fire HD 6" and 7" third generation uses Fire OS 4 "Sangria", which features profiles so each user on the tablet can have their own settings and apps.

The Fire HD 8 and 10 fifth generation uses Fire OS 5 "Bellini" and was released in late 2015. In September 2016, Amazon released virtual assistant Alexa for the sixth generation Fire tablets.

The 2018 model of the Fire HD 8 has Fire OS 6 preinstalled, which is based on Android 7.1 "Nougat". It also includes Alexa Hands-Free and the new "Show Mode", in which the tablet acts like an Amazon Echo Show.

The 2019 model of the Fire HD 10 (and the 2020 model of Fire HD 8) has Fire OS 7 preinstalled, which is based on Android 9 "Pie".

The 2021 model of the Fire HD 10 / Fire HD 10 Plus introduced 64-bit app support (arm64-v8a Android ABI) for the first time in the Fire HD series.

== Models ==
Overview on generations and models for all Fire (including Amazon Fire) tablet devices:

Display Size (Diag.) Generation (Year)	6 in	7 in	8 in	8.9 in	10.1 in	11 in
1st (2011)		Kindle Fire				
2nd (2012)		Kindle Fire; Kindle Fire HD				
2.5th (2012)				Kindle Fire HD WiFi; Kindle Fire HD WAN		
3rd (2013)		Kindle Fire; Kindle Fire HD WiFi; Kindle Fire HD WAN	Kindle Fire HD WiFi; Kindle Fire HD WAN			
4th (2014)	Fire HD	Fire HD		Fire HDX WiFi; Fire HDX WAN		
5th (2015)		Fire 7	Fire HD 8		Fire HD 10	
6th (2016)			Fire HD 8			
7th (2017)		Fire 7	Fire HD 8		Fire HD 10	
8th (2018)			Fire HD 8			
9th (2019)		Fire 7			Fire HD 10	
10th (2020)			Fire HD 8 Fire HD 8+			
11th (2021)					Fire HD 10; Fire HD 10+	
12th (2022)		**Fire 7**	Fire HD 8 Fire HD 8+			
13th (2023)					**Fire HD 10**	**Fire Max 11**
12th (2024)			**Fire HD 8**			

Note: Items in bold are currently available.

=== Discontinued Fire HD tablet devices ===
Devices that no longer receive updates to FireOS or do not receive FireOS feature updates.

Kindle Fire HD models (2011 - 2013)
Generation (within Fire tablets*)		2nd	2.5th	3rd
Model Year		2012	2012	2013
Model		Kindle Fire HD 7	Kindle Fire HD 8.9	Kindle Fire HD 7
Code name		Tate	Jem	Soho
Model Number		KFTT	KFJWA (WAN); KFJWI (Wi-Fi)	KFSOWI
Release date		September 14, 2012	November 20, 2012	October 2, 2013
Status		Discontinued	Discontinued	Discontinued
Release Time OS		Fire OS 2.4 based on Android 4.0.3 (got Fire OS 4.1.1 in 2014)		Fire OS 4 (or 3.2)
System Version		7.5.1	8.5.1	—N/a
Fire OS (latest)		3.1		4.5.5.3
Screen	Size (diagonal)	7 in (18 cm)	8.9 in (23 cm)	7 in (18 cm)
Screen	Resolution	1280 × 800	1920 × 1200	1280 × 800
Screen	Density	216 ppi	254 ppi	216 ppi
CPU	Maker	Texas Instruments		
CPU	Kind	Dual-core OMAP4		
CPU	Model	4460 HS	4470 HS	
CPU	Cores	2 × ARM Cortex-A9 @ 1.2 GHz	2 × ARM Cortex-A9 @ 1.5 GHz	
CPU	Width	32-bit		
GPU	Designer	Imagination; Technologies		
GPU	Kind	PowerVR		
GPU	Model	SGX540	SGX544	
GPU	Clock	384 MHz		
RAM		1 GiB		
Storage (internal)	Wi-Fi	16 GB or 32 GB		8 GB or 16 GB
Storage (internal)	+Cellular	—N/a	32 GB or 64 GB	—N/a
Camera (front)		1.3 MP HD 720p		—N/a
Microphone		Yes		—N/a
HDMI		microHDMI		—N/a
Wireless	Wi-Fi	Dual-band; 802.11 a/b/g/n		
Wireless	Bluetooth	Bluetooth 3.0 + EDR (HID and A2DP profiles only)		Bluetooth 4.0 + EDR (HID and A2DP profiles only)
Wireless	+Cellular	—N/a	adds 4G LTE	—N/a
Location	Wi-Fi	Wi-Fi based		
Location	+Cellular	—N/a	adds GPS and aGPS	—N/a
Proximity	+Cellular	—N/a	Yes	—N/a
Compass	+Cellular	—N/a	Yes	—N/a
Light sensor		Yes		—N/a
Accelerometer		Yes		
Gyroscope		Yes		
Connectors		USB 2.0 Micro-B; Micro HDMI; 3.5mm audio jack		USB 2.0 Micro-B; 3.5mm audio jack
Weight	Wi-Fi	395 g (13.9 oz)	545 g (19.2 oz)	345 g (12.2 oz)
Weight	+Cellular	—N/a	567 g (20.0 oz)	—N/a
Dimensions		193 mm × 137 mm × 10.3 mm (7.60 in × 5.39 in × 0.41 in)	240 mm × 160 mm × 8.8 mm (9.45 in × 6.30 in × 0.35 in)	191 mm × 128 mm × 10.6 mm (7.52 in × 5.04 in × 0.42 in)
Battery		4400 mAh	6000 mAh	4400 mAh
Legend: Unsupported Supported **Latest version**

Amazon Fire HD models (2014 - 2017) that run Fire OS 5
Generation (within Fire tablets*)		4th	5th	6th	7th	
Model Year		2014	2015	2016	2017	
Model		Fire HD 6 and 7	Fire HD 8 and 10	Fire HD 8	Fire HD 8	Fire HD 10
Code name		HD 6: Ariel HD 7: Aston	HD 8: Memphis HD10: Thebes	Giza	Douglas	Suez
Model Number		HD 6: KFARWI; HD 7: KFASWI	HD 8: KFMEWI; HD 10: KFTBWI	KFGIWI	KFDOWI	KFSUWI
Release date		October 2, 2014	September 30, 2015	September 21, 2016	June 7, 2017	October 11, 2017
Status		Discontinued	Discontinued	Discontinued	Discontinued	Discontinued
Release Time OS		Fire OS 5 (or 4.5.2)	Fire OS 5		Fire OS 5.7.0.0	Fire OS 5.3.5
Fire OS (latest)		5.6.8.0	5.6.8.0		5.7.1.0	
Screen	Size (diagonal)	HD 6: 6 in (15 cm); HD 7: 7 in (18 cm)	HD 8: 8 in (20 cm); HD 10: 10 in (25 cm)	8 in (20 cm)		10.1 in (26 cm)
Screen	Resolution	1280 × 800				1920 x 1200
Screen	Density	HD 6: 252 ppi HD 7: 216 ppi	HD 8: 189 ppi HD 10: 149 ppi	189 ppi		224 ppi
CPU	Maker	MediaTek				
CPU	Kind	Quad-core ARM big.LITTLE		Quad-core		
CPU	Model	MT8135V		MT8163V/B		MT8173
CPU	Cores	2 × ARM Cortex-A15 @ 1.5 GHz; 2 × ARM Cortex-A7 @ 1.2 GHz		4 × ARM Cortex-A53 @ 1.3 GHz		2 × ARM Cortex-A72 @ 1.8 GHz; 2 × ARM Cortex-A53 @ 1.4 GHz
CPU	Width	32-bit		64-bit (in 32-bit mode)		
GPU	Designer	Imagination; Technologies		ARM Holdings		Imagination; Technologies
GPU	Kind	PowerVR		Mali		PowerVR
GPU	Model	G6200		T720 MP2		GX6250
GPU	Clock	450 MHz		650 MHz	?	?
RAM		1 GiB		1.5 GiB		2 GiB
Storage	Internal	8 GB or 16 GB	HD 8: 8–16 GB; HD 10: 16–64 GB	16 GB or 32 GB		32 GB or 64 GB
Storage	External		Up to 128 GB microSDXC	Up to 200 GB microSDXC	Up to 256 GB microSDXC	
Camera	Back	2 MP	5 MP	2 MP		
Camera	Front	0.3 MP	1.3 MP HD 720p	0.3 MP		
Microphone		Yes				
HDMI		Amazon; HDMI Adapter	—N/a			
Wireless	WiFi	Single-band; 802.11 b/g/n	Dual-band; 802.11 a/b/g/n/ac	Dual-band; 802.11 a/b/g/n		Dual-band; 802.11 a/b/g/n/ac
Wireless	Bluetooth	Bluetooth 4.0 LE		Bluetooth 4.1 LE		
Location		Wi-Fi based				
Light sensor		—N/a		Yes		
Accelerometer		Yes				
Gyroscope		Yes			—N/a	
Connectors		USB 2.0 Micro-B (SlimPort-compatible); 3.5mm audio jack	USB 2.0 Micro-B; 3.5mm audio jack			
Weight		HD 6: 290 g (10 oz); HD 7: 337 g (11.9 oz)	HD 8: 311 g (11.0 oz); HD 10: 432 g (15.2 oz)	341 g (12.0 oz)	369 g (13.0 oz)	500 g (17.7 oz)
Dimensions		HD 6: 160 mm × 103 mm × 10.7 mm (6.30 in × 4.06 in × 0.42 in); HD 7: 191 mm × 128 mm × 10.6 mm (7.52 in × 5.04 in × 0.42 in)	HD 8: 214 mm × 128 mm × 7.7 mm (8.43 in × 5.04 in × 0.30 in); HD 10: 262 mm × 159 mm × 7.7 mm (10.31 in × 6.26 in × 0.30 in)	214 mm × 128 mm × 9.2 mm (8.43 in × 5.04 in × 0.36 in)	214 mm × 128 mm × 9.7 mm (8.43 in × 5.04 in × 0.38 in)	262 mm x 159 mm x 9.8 mm (10.3 in x 6.3 in x 0.4 in)
Battery		8.5 hours	3830 mAh / 8 hours	4750 mAh / 12 hours		6300 mAh / 10 hours
Legend: Unsupported Supported **Latest version**

=== Fire HD tablet devices ===
Devices that run currently supported FireOS versions.

Fire OS 7 (2018 - 2021)
Generation (within Fire tablets*)		8th	9th	10th	11th
Model Year		2018	2019	2020	2021
Model		Fire HD 8	Fire HD 10	Fire HD 8 / Fire HD 8 Plus	Fire HD 10 / Fire HD 10 Plus
Code name		Karnak	Maverick	Onyx	Trona
Model Number		KFKAWI	KFMAWI	KFONWI	KFTRWI (T76N2B) / KFTRPWI (T76N2P)
Release date		October 4th, 2018	October 30th, 2019	June 3rd, 2020	May 26th, 2021
Status		Supported	Supported	Supported	Supported
Release Time OS		Fire OS 6	Fire OS 7.3.1.0	Fire OS 7.3.1.3	Fire OS 7.3.2.7
Fire OS (latest)		7.3.3.1	7.3.3.1	7.3.3.1	7.3.3.1
Screen	Size (diagonal)	8 in (20 cm)	10.1 in (26 cm)	8 in (20 cm)	10.1 in (26 cm)
Screen	Resolution	1280 x 800	1920 x 1200	1280 x 800	1920 x 1200
Screen	Density	189 ppi	224 ppi	189 ppi	224 ppi
CPU	Maker	MediaTek			
CPU	Kind	Quad-core	Octa-core	Quad-core	Octa-core
CPU	Model	MT8163V/B	MT8183	MT8168	MT8183
CPU	Cores	4 × ARM Cortex-A53 @ 1.3 GHz	4 × ARM Cortex-A73 @ 2.0 GHz; 4 × ARM Cortex-A53 @ 2.0 GHz	4 × ARM Cortex-A53 @ 2.0 GHz	4 × ARM Cortex-A73 @ 2.0 GHz; 4 × ARM Cortex-A53 @ 2.0 GHz
CPU	Width	64-bit (in 32-bit mode)			64-bit & 32-bit
GPU	Designer	ARM Holdings			
GPU	Kind	Mali			
GPU	Model	T720 MP2	G72 MP3	G52 3EE MC1	G72 MP3
GPU	Clock	-	800 MHz		800 MHz
RAM		1.5 GiB	2 GiB	2 GiB / 3 GiB	3 GiB / 4 GiB
Storage	Internal	16 GB or 32 GB	32 GB or 64 GB	32 GB or 64 GB	32 GB or 64 GB
Storage	External	Up to 400 GB microSDXC	Up to 512 GB microSDXC	Up to 1 TB microSDXC	
Camera	Back	2 MP			5 MP
Camera	Front	2 MP			
Microphone		Yes			
Wireless	Wi-Fi	Dual-band; 802.11 a/b/g/n	Dual-band; 802.11 a/b/g/n/ac		
Wireless	Bluetooth	Bluetooth 4.1 LE	Bluetooth 4.2 LE	Bluetooth 5.0 LE	
Location		Wi-Fi based			
Light sensor		Yes			
Accelerometer		Yes			
Connectors		USB 2.0 Micro-B; 3.5mm audio jack	USB-C (USB 2.0); 3.5mm audio jack		
Weight		363 g (12.8 oz)	504 g (17.8 oz)	355 g (12.5 oz)	468 g (16.5 oz)
Dimensions		214 mm × 128 mm × 9.7 mm (8.4 in × 5.0 in × 0.38 in)	262 mm × 159 mm × 9.8 mm (10 in × 6.3 in × 0.39 in)	202 mm × 137 mm × 9.7 mm (8.0 in × 5.4 in × 0.38 in)	247 mm × 166 mm × 9.2 mm (9.7 in × 6.5 in × 0.36 in)
Battery		4750 mAh / 10 hours	6300 mAh / 12 hours	4850 mAh / 12 hours	6500 mAh / 12 hours
Wireless Charging		—N/a		Yes (Plus model only)	
Legend: Unsupported Supported **Latest version**

Fire OS 8 (2022 - 2024)
Generation (within Fire tablets*)		12th	13th		12th
Model Year		2022	2023		2024
Model		Fire HD 8 / Fire HD 8 Plus	Fire Max 11	Fire HD 10	Fire HD 8
Code name		Raphite	Sunstone	Tungsten	Raphite
Model Number		KFRAWI / KFRAPWI	KFSNWI	KFTUWI	KFRAPWI (3GB) KFRASWI (4GB)
Release date		October 2022	June 14, 2023	October 18, 2023	October 2, 2024
Status		Current	Current	Current	Current
Release Time OS		FireOS 8.3.1.9	Fire OS 8	Fire OS 8	Fire OS 8
Fire OS (latest)		8.3.3.5	8.3.3.5	8.3.3.5	
Screen	Size (diagonal)	8 in (20 cm)	11 in (28 cm)	10.1 in (26 cm)	8 in (20 cm)
Screen	Resolution	1280 x 800	2000 x 1200 IPS	1920 x 1200	1280 x 800
Screen	Density	189 ppi	213 ppi	224 ppi	189 ppi
CPU	Maker	MediaTek			
CPU	Kind	Hexa-Core	Octa-core	Octa-core	Hexa-core
CPU	Model	MT8169A	MT8188J	MT8186A	MT8169A
CPU	Cores	6 × ARM Cortex-A55 @ 2.0 GHz	2 × ARM Cortex-A78 @ 2.2 GHz 6 × ARM Cortex-A55 @ 2 GHz	2 × ARM Cortex-A76 @ 2.05 GHz 6 × ARM Cortex-A55 @ 2.0 GHz	6 × ARM Cortex-A55 @ 2.0 GHz
CPU	Width	64-bit & 32-bit			
GPU	Designer	ARM Holdings			
GPU	Kind	Mali			
GPU	Model	G52 2EE MC2	G57 MC2	G52 MC2 2EE	G52 2EE MC2
GPU	Clock		950 MHz	1 GHz	
RAM		2 GiB / 3 GiB	4 GiB	3 GiB / 4 GiB	3 GiB / 4 GiB
Storage	Internal	32 GB or 64 GB	64 GB or 128 GB	32 GB or 64 GB	32 GB or 64 GB
Storage	External	Up to 1 TB microSDXC			
Camera	Back	2 MP / 5 MP	8 MP	5 MP	5 MP
Camera	Front	2 MP	8 MP	5 MP	2 MP
Microphone		Yes			
Wireless	Wi-Fi	Dual-band; 802.11 a/b/g/n/ac	Dual-band 802.11 a/b/g/n/ac/ax (WiFi 6)	Dual-band 802.11 a/b/g/n/ac	
Wireless	Bluetooth	Bluetooth 5.2 LE	Bluetooth 5.3 BLE		Bluetooth 5.2 BLE
Location		Wi-Fi based			
Light sensor		Yes			
Accelerometer		Yes			
Connectors		USB-C (USB 2.0); 3.5mm audio jack	USB-C (USB 2.0) + audio; Keyboard (pogo pins)	USB-C (USB 2.0) + audio; 3.5 mm audio jack	
Weight		337 g (11.88 oz)	490 g (17.28 oz)	433.6 g (15.29 oz)	337 g (11.88 oz)
Dimensions		201.90 mm × 137.34 mm × 9.6 mm (7.9 in × 5.4 in × 0.38 in)	259.1 mm × 163.7 mm × 7.5 mm (10 in × 6.4 in × 0.30 in)	246 mm × 164.8 mm × 8.6 mm (9.7 in × 6.5 in × 0.34 in)	201.90 mm × 137.34 mm × 9.6 mm (7.9 in × 5.4 in × 0.38 in)
Battery		4850 mAh / 13 hours	7500 mAh / 14 hours	6500 mAh / 13 hours	4850 mAh / 13 hours
Wireless Charging		Yes (Plus model only)	—N/a		
Legend: Unsupported Supported **Latest version**

*tables above only includes data on tablets Amazon lists in the HD family.

The Model number consists of three parts: first the KF prefix for 'Kindle Fire', second one or two letters derived from the code name, third WI for Wi-Fi or WA for cellular interface.

== Timeline ==
Timeline of Amazon Fire tablet models

Disclaimer: The discontinuation dates may not be precise.

== System modifications and third-party firmware ==
Fire Toolbox - Non-permanent modifications to the stock firmware on Fire tablets from 4th through 13th generation.

LineageOS - On October 10, 2026 device support was added for the Fire Max 11 (sunstone).

== See also ==
- Comparison of:
  - Tablet computers
  - E-book readers
