= Android Developer Lab =

Series of mobile software development-focused events

Android Developer Lab is a series of mobile software development-focused events around the world held annually by Google. They include bootcamps and technical sessions focused on Android and give participants an excellent chance to learn about the state of the Android platform, get hands-on with the latest version of the SDK, test applications on the latest sample Android devices, get questions answered by Google engineers from the Android team as well as meet other like-minded members of the local Android developer community.

Bootcamp is a hands-on training experience where Google engineers show attendees how to get started with Android development, from Android SDK installation to the creation of Android applications. Technical Sessions are presentations where Google engineers speak about key Android features and show developers how to use them effectively to create high quality applications.

== Description ==
ADL will guide developer through best practices to build high quality phone and tablet apps for Android. ADL will cover the latest in Android technologies, market cloud services, designing polished and immersive user experiences, and building rich apps for phones and tablets with a single code base. Android Advocates are going on a world tour, traveling to locations all around the globe! Hear about the state of the Android platform, get hands-on with the latest version of the SDK, meet like-minded Android engineers, play with the latest Android devices, test your apps, and ask your questions directly to Android team members.

== History ==
=== 2007 ===
- The Android SDK was released on November 16, 2007. The first time developers have the necessary API libraries and developer tools to build, test, and debug apps for android.

=== 2008 ===
- Android Developer Challenge is now open for business and accepting developers’ submissions on January 3, 2008.
- Android team announced the brand-new Android 1.0 SDK, release 1 on September 23, 2008.
- Android team and its Handset Alliance partners have now released the source code for android on October 21, 2008.

=== 2009 ===
- Android team announced that the Android SDK now supports Android 2.0, Éclair, which brought new developer APIs for sync, Bluetooth, and a few other areas.
- Android team hosted a series of all-day Android developer labs in Mountain View, CA - Nov 9, New York, NY - Nov 16, London, UK - Nov 17, Tokyo, JP - Nov 18, Taipei, TW - Nov 20.

=== 2010 ===
- Android team is embarking on a world tour, which include cities in North America, Austin, Texas – Feb 4, Seattle, Washington – Feb 8, Waterloo, Ontario, Canada – Feb 8, Washington, D.C. – Feb 9, Mountain View, California – Feb 10, Cambridge, Massachusetts – Feb 11, New York, New York – Feb 12, Europe, London, UK – Feb 2, Paris, France – Feb 8, Berlin, Germany – Feb 10, Zurich, Switzerland – Feb 12, Madrid, Spain – Feb 13, and Asia, Singapore – Feb 28, Taipei, Taiwan – March 3, Hong Kong – March 5.

=== 2011 ===
- Android team announced that the full SDK for Android 3.0 is now available to developers.
- Android team announced Android 4.0, Ice Cream Sandwich – a new version of the platform that brings a refined, unified user experience for phones, tablets, and more.
- Android team hosted a series of all-day Android developer labs in Bangalore – August 2, Seattle – August 15 and 16, New York – August 23 and 24, Los Angeles – September 2, Berlin – September 28 and 29, London – October 3 and 5, Paris – October 27 and 28.

=== 2012 ===
- Android team scheduled Android Developer Labs for Melbourne – January 31, Sydney – February 3, and Auckland – February 8.
- Android team announced the latest version of the Android platform, Android 4.1 Jelly Bean on June 27, 2012.

== Pre-requisites ==
- Laptop with the Eclipse&Android SDK (API 15) installed and configured.
- Android device for debugging – could be a phone, tablet or both
- Solid understanding of Android fundamentals – activities, layouts, app like cycle, etc.

== Structure ==
Android Developer Lab consists of Bootcamp and Technical Sessions.

- Bootcamp is a hands-on training experience where experienced Google engineers will show attendees how to get started with Android Development, from machine setup to SDK download to the creation of a few simple applications.
- Technical Sessions are presentations where Google engineers will speak about key Android features and show developers how to use them effectively to create great applications. All sessions will be in English.
- Note android developer lab Brazil will only feature Bootcamp, not technical sessions. Android developer Lab in Argentina, the technical sessions will occur within DevFest. During registration for ADL Argentina, you will be given the option to sign up for the Android technical sessions at DevFest as well.

== Services ==
Android Developer Lab's lab sessions usually are held between October and November at locations across the globe. The list of dates and location are listed on the home page. Most locations are only offered for one day, and space is limited. The schedule for each lab session varies by location, but in general the lab session will last 4–6 hours. Details will be emailed to attendees in advance of the event. The precise schedule for each lab session varies by location and availability of speakers. However, the Android Developer Lab will follow those procedures. First members of the Android team at Google will give a presentations talking about the fundamentals, style and pattern of the Android Design. Next, Android Developer Lab will present the Android's new features such as Android Beam and Wifi Direct. There will be time to get hands on with the newest Android SDK. People will have the chance to play with and test applications on many sample devices. People will also have the opportunity to get their questions answered by Android experts, as well as a chance to meet other likeminded members of their local Android software development community. The final part will be Code Lab, aiming to introduce developers to fragments, and leverage fragments to enable more flexibility with their applications.

== Occurrences ==
It has been held four times to date:

- Android Developer Lab 2009: November 9 in Mountain View, CA, US, November 16 in New York, NY, US, November 17 in London, United Kingdom, November 18 in Tokyo, Japan, November 20 in Taipei, Taiwan.
- Android Developer Lab 2010: February 4 in Austin, TX, US, February 8 in Seattle, WA, US, February 8 in Waterloo, ON, Canada, February 9 in Washington, D.C., US, February 10 in Mountain View, CA, US, February 11 in Cambridge, MA, US, February 12 in New York, NY, US, February 2 in London, United Kingdom, February 8 in Paris, France, February 10 in Berlin, Germany, February 12 in Zurich, Switzerland, February 13 in Madrid, Spain, February 17 in Barcelona, Spain, February 28 in Singapore, March 3 in Taipei, Taiwan, March 5 in Hong Kong, October 28 in São Paulo, Brazil, FIXFIXNovember 1 in Buenos Aires, Argentina, FIXFIXNovember 4 in Santiago, Chile.
- Android Developer Lab 2011: August 2 in Bangalore, India, August 15 & 16 in Seattle, WA, US, August 23 & 24 in New York, NY, US, September 2 in Los Angeles, CA, US, September 28 & 29 in Berlin, Germany, October 3 & 5 in London, United Kingdom, October 27 & 28 in Paris, France, December 2 in Taipei, Taiwan, December 6 in Hong Kong.
- Android Developer Lab 2012: January 31 in Melbourne, Australia, February 3 in Sydney, Australia, February 8 in Auckland, New Zealand.

== See also ==
- Google I/O
- AtGoogleTalks
- Google Developer Day
- Android Developer Day
