= Rope Rescue =

2011 video game

- Developer: Untame Games
- Publisher: Chillingo
- Engine: Unity
- Platforms: iOS, Android, Amazon Fire, Roku
- Release: October 20, 2011
- Genre: Puzzle

Rope Rescue is a 2D physics-based rope puzzle game developed by American studio Untame Games and published by Chillingo for iOS. The game stars a parrot officially named Rupert rescuing baby birds, who have been locked up in cages by the game's villain, King Bat.

== Reception ==
Reception

Aggregate score
Aggregator	Score
Metacritic	69/100

Review score
Publication	Score
TouchArcade	4/5

The game has received generally favorable reviews with a Metacritic score of 69/100 based on 5 reviews.

The TouchArcade review praised the complexity of the scrap metal, but noted the monotony of the elements. Also criticized were the screams of a parrot when it is pierced by a knife: «...but the way the knives are depicted sticking blade-first out of a rock, combined with the bird shrieking upon being stabbed, felt a little wrong for a casual puzzle game about saving little baby birds».
