= Google Developers Live =

Live, streaming content for Google developers

- Organizer: Google, Inc.
- Website: developers.google.com/live

Google Developers Live is the live, streaming content for the developers and Google developers of Google's platforms. Through the use of streaming video and Google+ hangouts, it is organized by Google. Google Developers Live features topics focused on building of web, mobile, and enterprise applications with Google and web technologies such as Android, HTML5, Chrome, ChromeOS, Google APIs, Google Web Toolkit, App Engine, Cloud, Google Maps, and YouTube.

== See also ==
- Google I/O
- Google Developer Day
- Android Developer Day
