= Node.Hack =

2012 video game

Node.Hack is a tap and play-style strategy game available for Android, iOS, Windows Phone, and Kindle Fire, developed by American studio 4gency and originally released in 2012.
