= Fire OS =

Android-based operating system for Amazon devices

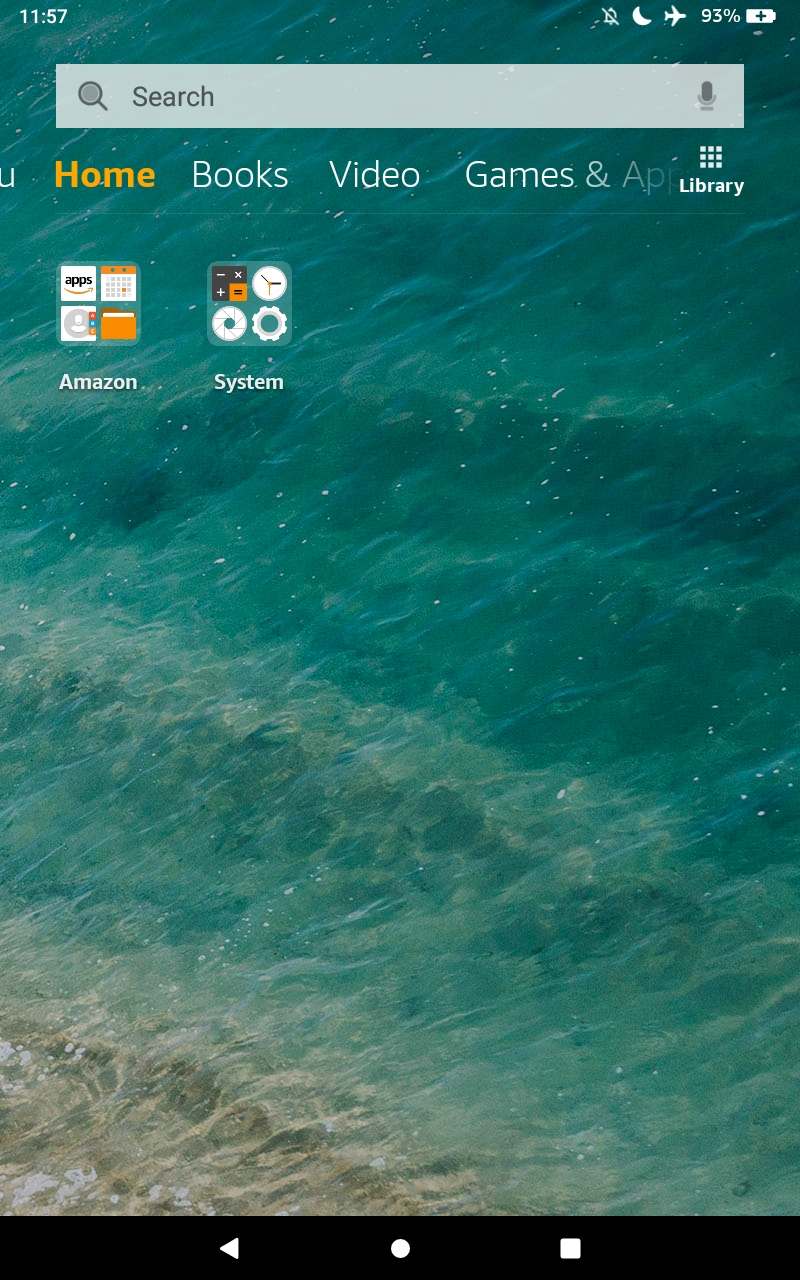
- Screenshot Fire OS 7.3.1.7 running on the Amazon Fire HD 8 Plus (10th generation)
- Developer: Amazon
- Written in: C (core), C++, Java (UI)
- OS family: Android (Linux)
- Working state: Current
- Source model: Based on the Android Open source project, with proprietary software & proprietary components
- Latest release: Fire OS 7.3.3.1 for 8th-11th generation devices; Fire OS 8.3.3.8 for 12th-13th generation devices / July 2025
- Marketing target: Budget/Low priced market, Members of the Amazon ecosystem
- Package manager: Amazon Appstore, APK
- Supported platforms: 32-bit and 64-bit ARM
- Kernel type: Monolithic (modified Linux kernel)
- Userland: Bionic libc, mksh shell, Toybox as the native core utilities with a few from NetBSD
- Default user interface: Graphical (Multi-touch)
- License: Proprietary EULA; based on Apache License 2.0; Modified Linux kernel under GNU GPL v2
- Official website: developer.amazon.com/docs/fire-tv/fire-os-overview.html

Fire OS is an Android (AOSP)-based operating system developed by Amazon for their hardware devices. Fire OS includes a customized user interface primarily centered on content consumption, and heavy ties to content available from Amazon's storefronts including Appstore and services.

Amazon is currently moving away from Fire OS, replacing it with Vega OS and a more natural version of Android respectively instead.

== History ==
Amazon began referring to the Android derivative as Fire OS with its third iteration of Fire tablets. Unlike previous Fire models, whose operating system was described as "based on" Android, Fire OS 3.0 was described as "compatible with" Android.

=== Fire OS 5 ===
Based on Android 5.1 "Lollipop", it added an updated interface. The home screen has a traditional application grid and pages for content types, as opposed to the previous carousel interface. It also introduced On Deck, a function that automatically moves content out of offline storage to maintain storage space for new content; the Word Runner speed reading tool; and screen color filters. Parental controls were enhanced with a new web browser for FreeTime mode featuring a curated selection of content appropriate for children, and an Activity Center for monitoring children's usage. It removed support for device encryption, which an Amazon spokesperson stated was an enterprise-oriented feature that was underused. In March 2016, after the removal was publicized and criticized in the wake of the FBI–Apple encryption dispute, Amazon announced it would restore the feature in a future patch.

=== Fire OS 6 ===
Based on Android 7.1.2 "Nougat", its main changes and additions include:

- Adoptable storage, allowing users to format and use their SD card as internal storage
- Doze/App standby, aiming to improve battery life by forcing devices to sleep when not actively used, adding restrictions to apps that would normally continue to run background processes

=== MediaTek exploits (2019) ===
In early 2019, security exploits for six Fire Tablet models and one Fire TV model were discovered that could allow temporary root access, permanent root access, and bootloader unlocking (Note: These exploits usually depend on certain factors such as: Fire OS version, bootloader/fastboot/recovery version, date the device was released (eg. in the case of hardware exploits because the exploit may be fixed with a new revision), etc.) due to security vulnerabilities in multiple MediaTek chipsets.

=== Fire OS 7 ===
Based on Android 9 "Pie", it was released in 2019 for all 8th-11th generation Fire tablets.

=== Fire OS 8 ===
FireOS 8 is the latest release of FireOS for 12th-13th generation Fire tablets, based on Android 11, information about the release became available via Amazon developer documentation around May 2022.

FireOS 8 incorporates changes from Android 10 and Android 11. Changes include, but are not limited to;TLS 1.3 support enabled by default, High Efficiency Image File Format (HEIF) support, Dark mode, One-time permissions, Sharing improvements, and Device auto backups (user needs to opt-in to device backups). However, it is noted in the Amazon developer documentation that some Android 11 features such as File Based Encryption (FBE) are not supported yet.

Fire OS will continue to be supported on existing Amazon Fire TV devices and will continue to be used on newer devices.

=== Fire OS 14 ===
FireOS 14 is based on Android 14. Development information was made available on Amazon developer documentation in 2025.

== Features ==
Fire OS is based on the Android Open Source Project (AOSP). It does not come with Google mobile services pre-installed; therefore, Amazon cannot use the Android trademarks to market the devices. Users are able to sideload the Google Play store; however, full compatibility is not guaranteed if the app depends on Google services.

Because Google services are not pre-installed, Amazon develops and uses its own apps in their place, some of which include Amazon Appstore, Amazon Alexa, Prime Video, Amazon Music, Audible, Kindle Store, Silk Browser, Goodreads and Here WeGo.

Fire OS uses a customized home screen (launcher). As of Fire OS 7.3.2.3, the launcher features three sections:

- "For You" shows the weather, recently used apps, Alexa integration, then shows recommended content such as apps, books movies, etc.
- "Home" is the section for the icons of all of the apps currently installed on the device, apps on the Home section can be moved around or put into folders, a search bar is also available at the top of the launcher to search though local content on the device or search online using the Bing search engine.
- "Library" shows purchased items from Amazon services, such as apps, books, movies and TV shows from Prime Video, etc.

The OS features a multi-user system, which allows multiple people to set up and use separate user profiles.

Along with Amazon Kids and Amazon Kids+, a suite of parental controls is included which allows parents to create managed child profiles, set limits and set restrictions for minors.

== Devices ==
Current Amazon devices running Fire OS:

- Fire Tablets
- Fire TV
- Amazon Echo / Amazon Echo Show

Discontinued devices running Fire OS:

- Fire Phone

== List of Fire OS versions ==
Fire OS version	Base Android version	Android API level	Devices	Notes
1	2.3.3 Gingerbread	10	Fire	Reported as "Based on Android"
2	4.0 Ice Cream Sandwich	15	Fire HD	Reported as "Based on Android"
3	4.2.2 Jelly Bean	17	Fire HD (2nd gen.); Fire HDX	Reported as "Compatible with Android"
4	4.4.2 KitKat	19	Fire HD (3rd gen.); Fire HDX (2nd gen.)	
5	5.1 Lollipop	22	Fire 7 (7th gen.)	
6	7.1.2 Nougat	25	Fire 7 (9th gen.); Fire HD 8 (8th gen.)	Devices shipped with Fire OS 6 were later upgraded to Fire OS 7 when Amazon abandoned development.
7	9.0 Pie	28	Fire 7 (9th gen.); Fire HD 8 (8th gen.); Fire HD 8/8+ (10 gen.); Fire HD 10/10+ (11 gen.)	
8	11 (Note: Codenamed "Red Velvet Cake". Google stopped publicly using dessert names after Android 9 (Pie), but the dessert names are still used internally (at Google and in AOSP).)	30	Fire 7 (12th gen.); Fire HD 8 (12th gen.); Fire HD 10 (13th gen.); Fire Max 11	Some Android 11 features such as File Based Encryption are not supported.
14	14	34		
16	16	36		Reported as "Based on Android 15 and Android 16, for future Fire TV devices"

== Successors ==
=== Vega OS ===
In November 2023, a report surfaced of Amazon's plans to migrate away from Android to a custom Linux-based operating system known as Vega OS with plans to launch TVs running Vega in 2024. Amazon was reported to have been developing the operating system since 2017.

On September 30, 2025, Amazon officially announced Vega OS, which will be used on newer Fire TV devices, beginning with the Fire TV 4K Select, later on Fire TV Stick HD (2nd Generation), and Fire TV Stick 4K (3rd Generation).

Applications can be developed using React Native, or web technologies through a Chromium-based WebView.

=== Android ===
On October 8, 2026, Amazon announced the Amazon Alexa Tablet line of tablet computers that will run Android 16 and include Alexa+ integration. The Alexa tablets are the successor to and replacement for the Amazon Fire and Amazon Fire HD lines of tablets.

== See also ==
- Nokia X software platform, a similar fork by Nokia
- Tizen, a Linux-based OS by Samsung Electronics with an optional Android runtime
- Sailfish OS, a Linux-based mobile OS by Jolla which includes an Android runtime
- BlackBerry 10, a QNX-based mobile OS by BlackBerry which included an Android runtime and came with the Amazon Appstore preloaded
- Comparison of mobile operating systems
- PostmarketOS, a linux-based distribution for mobile phones, tablets, smartphones and others embedded devices, completely independent of Android/AOSP
