= Amazon Appstore =

App store by Amazon

- Developer: Amazon.com Services, LLC
- Release: March 22, 2011
- Final release: release-32.52.1.0.204529.0_800923810
- Operating system: Fire OS, Android, BlackBerry 10
- Included with: Fire OS, BlackBerry 10
- Type: App store
- License: Proprietary
- Website: www.amazon.com/gp/mas/get/android/

Amazon Appstore is an app store operated by Amazon.com Services, LLC, a subsidiary of Amazon. The store is primarily used as the storefront for Amazon's Android-based Fire OS. including Amazon Fire tablets, and Amazon Fire TV digital media players, and can be sideloaded and installed manually on third-party Android devices. Some Android devices may also be bundled with Amazon Appstore as part of compensation agreements. It was also used as a source of Android software for runtime environments on BlackBerry 10 and Windows 11.

On August 20, 2025, the Amazon Appstore became inaccessible on third party Android devices and apps bought from the Amazon Appstore no longer work on those devices, but will continue for Fire Tablets.

== History ==
The Amazon Appstore launched on March 22, 2011 and was made available in nearly 200 countries. Developers are paid 70% of the list price of the app or in-app purchase. Notable features that were included on launch included a "Free App of the Day" promotion, which offered different paid apps at no charge daily, and "Test Drive", which allowed users to demo apps in a web browser using an Adobe Flash client virtualized Android instance running on Amazon EC2.

In September 2011, Amazon announced the Amazon Fire tablet, which uses Amazon Appstore as its main source of apps. Ahead of the official release of Fire, Appstore was updated to include parental controls, a manager for subscriptions, and UI updates to adhere to the Fire's Android user interface.

In May 2013, Amazon introduced Amazon Coins as a form of payment for purchasing apps, games, and in-app purchases from the store. In August 2013, Amazon Appstore added support for HTML5 web apps.

The Test Drive feature was decommissioned in April 2015; Amazon stated that the service had been in decline, partly due to many apps not supporting the feature, and the increasing prevalence of the free-to-play business model making it obsolete.

In August 2015, Amazon Appstore replaced its daily free app program with "Actually Free", which was modeled after the Kindle Unlimited program. Apps in the program were offered at no charge to users, with Amazon paying revenue to developers based on per-minute usage of the apps by end-users. By contrast, developers did not receive any revenue for apps offered under the previous free app promotions. The "Actually Free" collection was accessible via a section of Amazon Appstore on Fire OS, but required users to download the separate "Amazon Underground" app (a version of the main Amazon retail app that integrated Appstore) on other Android devices.

In August 2017, Amazon announced that the Actually Free program would be discontinued, citing other monetization options such as Coins and Merch on Demand. The shutdown occurred in phases, with the program ending in 2019. In May 2023, Amazon announced it will close its Chinese App Store in July.

On March 5, 2024, Amazon and Microsoft announced deprecation of Windows Subsystem for Android, which allowed installation of Android apps on Windows 11. The companies immediately restricted new installations of Amazon Appstore and other apps on Windows 11, but pledged to continue serving updates for existing installations until March 5, 2025.

On February 20, 2025, Amazon updated its support pages to announce that Amazon Appstore for Android will cease to function on August 20, 2025.

== History of app growth ==
When the Amazon Appstore for Android launched in March 2011, it had about 3,800 apps. It reached 80,000 apps in June 2013 and 240,000 apps in June 2014. In June 2015, the app store had nearly 334,000 apps. The number of apps continued to increase and reached 489,000 in October 2019. By the time the Amazon App Store shut down for non-Fire devices in August 2025, 597,000 apps were available for download.

== Use on third-party Android-compatible platforms ==
Amazon Appstore has also been adopted by several operating systems as a source of Android-compatible software, in lieu of Google Play. In June 2014, BlackBerry Limited announced that it would add Amazon Appstore to BlackBerry 10 (which is based on real-time operating system QNX) beginning with version 10.3 for use with its Android runtime.

In June 2021, Microsoft announced that Amazon Appstore would be offered via Microsoft Store on Windows 11, for use with Windows Subsystem for Android. On March 5, 2024, Microsoft announced deprecation of WSA with support ending on March 5, 2025. As a result, support for the Amazon Appstore on Windows and apps installed from it would also end on March 5, 2025.

== Availability ==
Some countries are able to shop for apps on their local Amazon website. Countries with a local website that only offer a limited range of services, and countries without a local website can shop for apps on the US-based website Amazon.com

Country	Domain name and URL
United States, and various eligible countries & territories	amazon.com/appstore
Canada	amazon.ca/appstore
Japan	amazon.co.jp/Apps-Games/b?node=2381130051
United Kingdom, Gibraltar, Guernsey, Ireland, Isle of Man, Jersey	amazon.co.uk/appstore
Australia, New Zealand, Christmas Island, Cocos (Keeling) Islands, Norfolk Island, Cook Island, Niue, Tokelau	amazon.com.au/appstore
Brazil	amazon.com.br/appstore
Germany, Austria, Liechtenstein, Switzerland, Luxembourg, Finland, Netherlands	amazon.de/appstore
Spain, Andorra, Portugal	amazon.es/appstore
France metropolitan, Switzerland, Monaco, Belgium	amazon.fr/appstore
India	amazon.in/appstore
Italy, Vatican City, San Marino, Switzerland	amazon.it/appstore

== Reception ==
Shortly after the Amazon Appstore launch, the International Game Developers Association (IGDA) published an open letter expressing concerns that were primarily aimed at Amazon's distribution terms. The main concerns about the conditions were that Appstore terms force developers to permanently lower their Appstore prices if ever they do promotions on other stores, and that Amazon could choose to lower the price of an application while deciding to reduce the developer's share without having to ask permission. Following this address, Amazon clarified the Appstore developer agreement, but this did not assuage the IGDA's concerns, which declared that "Amazon's terms represent a threat to game developers".

In July 2011, the Swedish developer Bithack pulled its Apparatus application from the Appstore and published an open letter explaining that the store was a "disaster" for indie developers. The main problems related to the very slow review process, the absence of any means to filter unsupported devices, and that Amazon changed the price of the application without consulting the developer, leading to the IGDA reiterating its warnings concerning Amazon's policy once again.

== Accusation of trademark infringement by Apple ==
Apple filed a lawsuit against Amazon for using a similar name to the Apple App Store. Amazon claimed that the term was too generic to be trademarked, and asked the judge to dismiss the suit. Apple responded to Amazon's attempted dismissal of the lawsuit by claiming that Amazon was tarnishing the trademark by using the name. A federal judge denied Apple's request for a preliminary injunction, disagreeing with Amazon's claim that the term is generic, and citing that Apple had not established "a likelihood of confusion" with Amazon's services to obtain an injunction. Apple changed its complaint after Amazon started advertising the Kindle Fire, now saying that Amazon is trying to confuse customers further by dropping the "for Android" part of "Amazon Appstore for Android." In the amended complaint, Apple wrote that "Amazon's use is also likely to lessen the goodwill associated with Apple's App Store service and Apple products designed to utilize Apple's App Store service by associating Apple's App Store service with the inferior qualities of Amazon's service."

In January 2013, Apple's claims were rejected by a US District judge, who argued that the company presented no evidence that Amazon had "[attempted] to mimic Apple's site or advertising", or communicated that its service "possesses the characteristics and qualities that the public has come to expect from the Apple APP STORE and/or Apple products." In July 2013, Apple dropped the case.

== See also ==
- List of mobile app distribution platforms
- Google Play
- App Store (Apple)
- BlackBerry World
