= Amazon Fire =

Line of tablets by Amazon

- Final logo used from 2024 to 2026

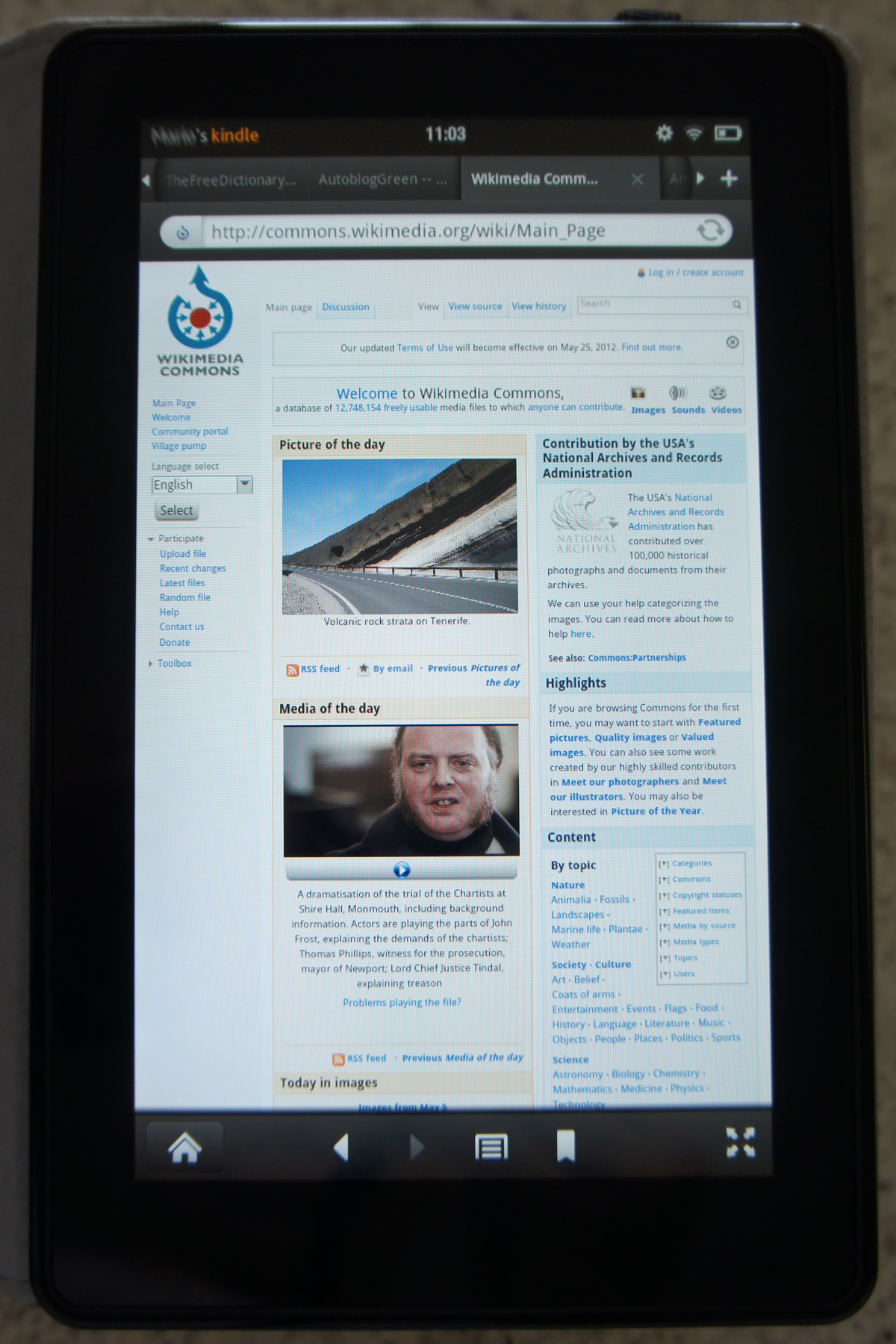
- Kindle Fire (7", 1st gen, 2011) showing Wikimedia Commons main page
- Also known as: Kindle Fire (2011–2014)
- Developer: Amazon Inc.
- Manufacturer: Quanta Computer
- Type: Tablet computer Smart speaker (by turning on show mode)
- Released: November 15, 2011 (US); September 6, 2012 (Europe); December 18, 2012 (Japan)
- Units sold: 7 million (as of October 2012)
- Operating system: Fire OS
- System on a chip: TI OMAP 4 (1st and 2nd gen); MediaTek MT81xx (5th gen and newer)
- CPU: Dual and Quad core (ARM)
- Memory: 512 MB RAM (1st gen); 1 GB RAM (2nd gen); 2 GB RAM (12th gen)
- Storage: 8 GB, 16 GB, or 32 GB
- Display: 7 inch, 1024×600 resolution, capacitive multi-touch display
- Graphics: PowerVR and Mali
- Sound: 3.5 mm stereo audio jack Top-mounted stereo speakers (1st and 2nd gen); Bottom-mounted mono speaker (5th gen and newer)
- Camera: Front and Rear facing cameras
- Connectivity: Micro-USB 2.0 (type B), USB-C 2.0 (12th gen); 3.5 mm stereo socket Wi-Fi; Bluetooth (5th gen and newer)
- Online services: Amazon Prime, Amazon Cloud Storage, Amazon Music, Amazon Prime Video, Amazon Silk, Amazon Appstore, Amazon Alexa, Amazon Kindle Store
- Dimensions: 190 mm (7.5 in) H 120 mm (4.7 in) W 11.4 mm (0.45 in) D
- Weight: 413 g (14.6 oz)
- Successor: Fire HD
- Website: Amazon Fire

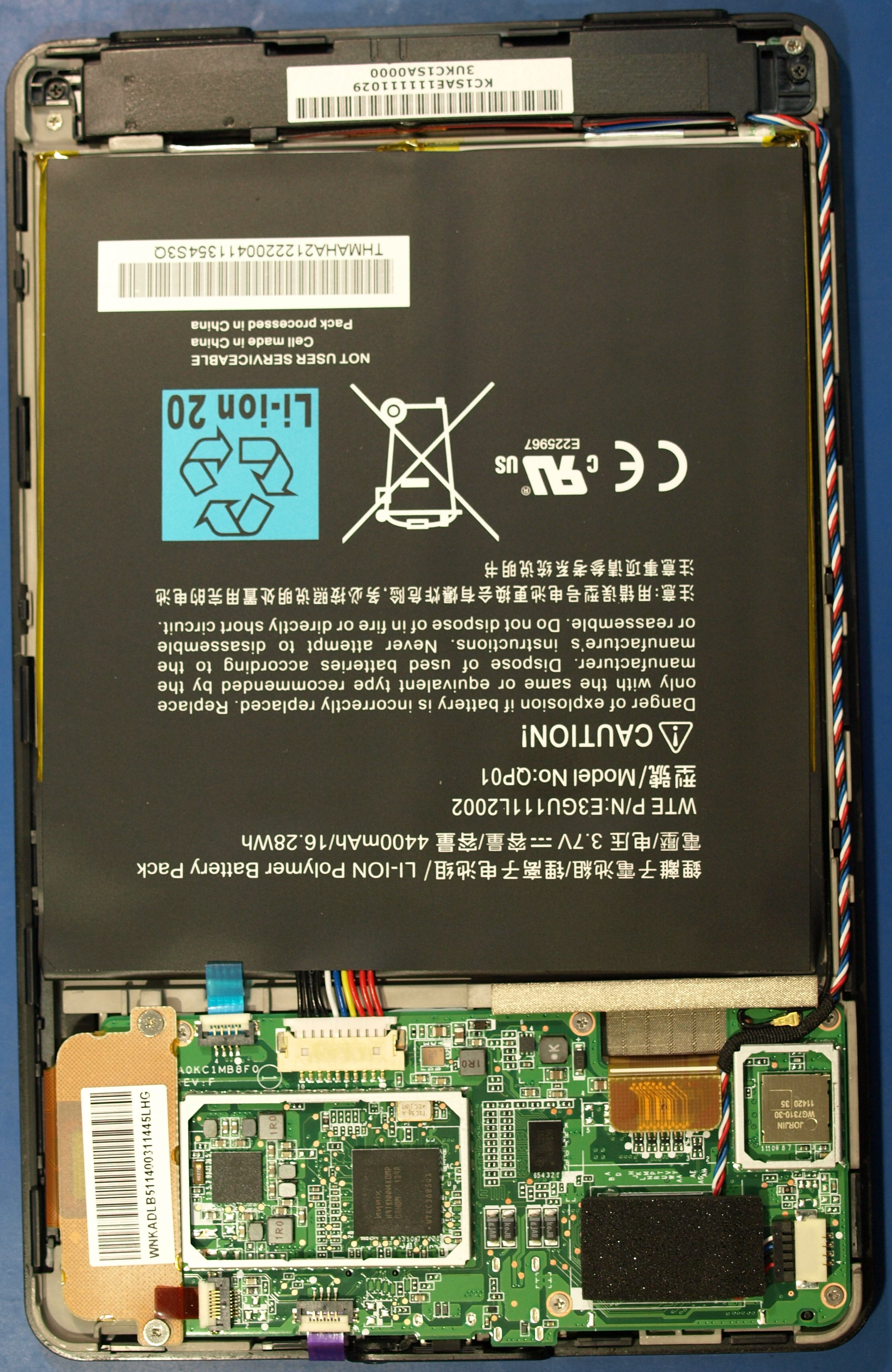
Kindle Fire showing components, back cover removed

The Amazon Fire, formerly called the Kindle Fire, is a line of tablet computers developed by Amazon. Built with Quanta Computer, the Kindle Fire was originally released in November of 2011, featuring a color 7-inch multi-touch display with IPS technology and running on Fire OS, an Android-based operating system. The Kindle Fire HD followed in September 2012, and the Kindle Fire HDX in September 2013. In September 2014, when the fourth generation was introduced, the name "Kindle" was dropped. In later generations, the Fire tablet can also convert into a Smart speaker, turning on the "Show Mode" options, where the primary interaction will be via voice commands through Alexa. Amazon furthered Alexa integration with a new line of tablets called Amazon Alexa Tablets, which run Android with modifications to include Alexa+ functionality without the extensive customization used to create Fire OS.

== History ==
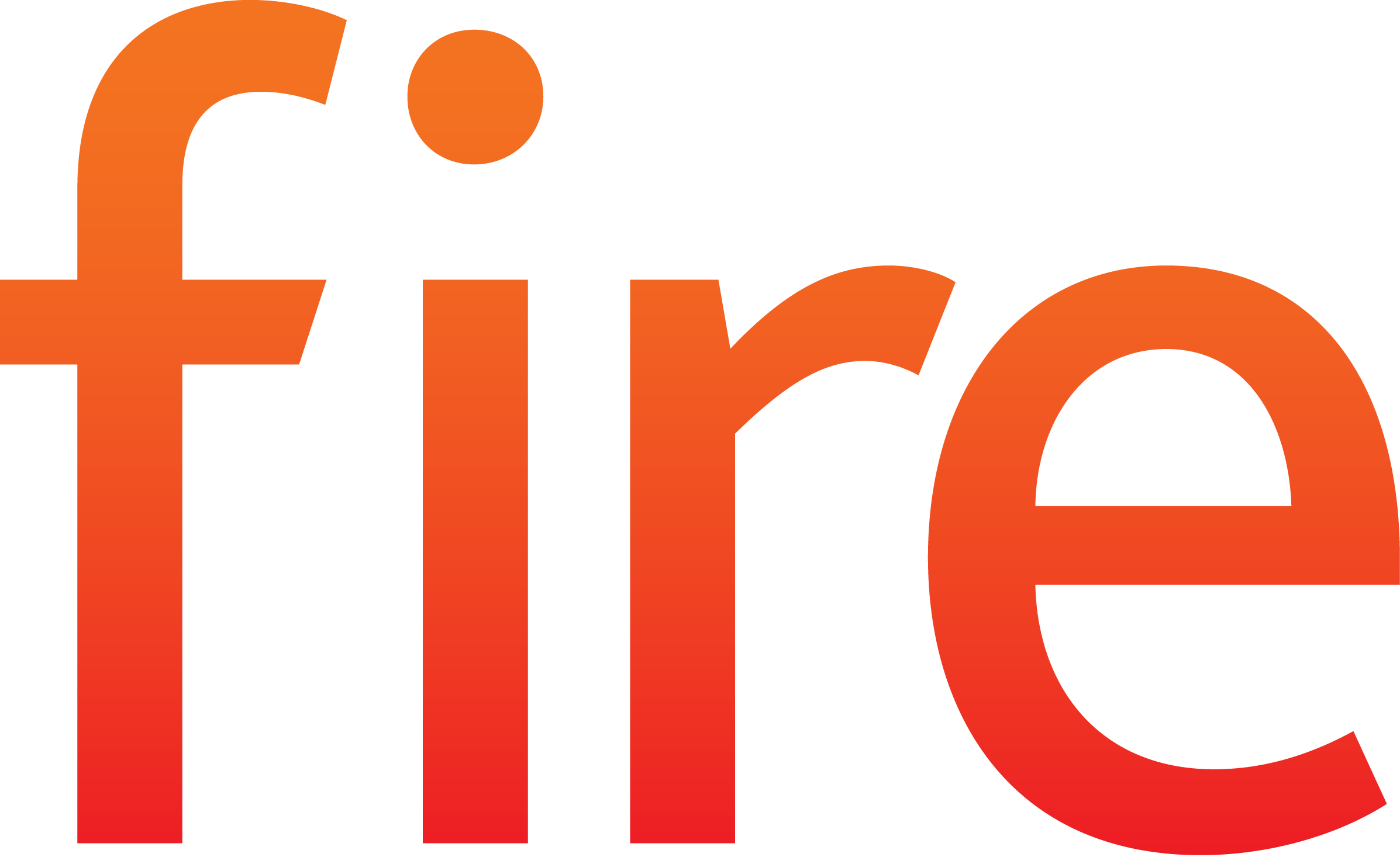
Logo used from 2015 to 2017

The Kindle Fire—which includes access to the Amazon Appstore, streaming movies and TV shows, and the Kindle Store for e-books—was released to consumers in the United States on November 14, 2011, after being announced on September 28.

The original Kindle Fire retailed for US$199 in 2011. Estimates of the device's initial bill of materials cost ranged from $150 to $202. Amazon's business strategy was stated in 2011 as making money through sales of digital content on the Fire, rather than through sales of the device itself.

On September 6, 2012, the Kindle Fire was upgraded to the second generation, and its price was reduced to US$159, RAM upgraded to 1 GB and processor clock speed upgraded to 1.2 GHz. On September 7, 2012, upgrades to the device were announced with consumer availability to those European countries with a localised version of Amazon's website (United Kingdom, France, Germany, Italy and Spain).

As of October 2012, the Kindle Fire was the second best selling tablet after Apple's iPad, with about 7 million units sold according to estimates by Forrester Research and as of 2013 Amazon's tablets were the fourth best selling.

The Fire tablet line was not updated until 2015; Amazon only released Fire HD and Fire HDX tablets during that time. In 2015, Amazon made a full refresh of their tablet family where they brought the range down market as a series of budget focused devices, returning to the lower-spec Fire line and cancelling the HDX line.

In September 2015, Amazon announced the release of the Fire 7, priced at US$49.99 for the 8GB version that displays advertisements on the lock screen. As of March 2016 it was the lowest-priced Amazon tablet. In June 2016, its price was dropped briefly to US$39.99. This fifth generation tablet introduced a micro SD card slot for extra storage.

A slightly improved Fire 7 was released in June 2017, keeping the US$49.99 price point.

An upgraded model of Fire 7 was announced in May 2019, with a scheduled release in June 2019 and keeping the US$49.99 price point.

In 2022, Amazon released a significantly updated model of the Fire 7. New features to the basic Fire line are USB-C, Fire OS 8, a 2 MP front camera, a larger 10-hour life capable battery, and a significantly faster SoC with twice the RAM and storage of the previous generation. Though the tablet still features budget hardware, Amazon increased the base price to $59.99.

On October 8, 2026, Amazon announced a new line of tablets called Amazon Alexa Tablets. They are a new series of AI-focused devices that run regular Android 16 on more capable and powerful hardware housed inside of new all-aluminum unibody chassis. Media reports claim Amazon has said they will stop shipping Fire tablets in the next couple of months. That timing coincides with Amazon's annual sales promotions on Black Friday and Cyber Monday.

== Design ==
=== Hardware ===
The Kindle Fire hardware is manufactured by Quanta Computer (an Original Design Manufacturer), which also originally helped design the BlackBerry PlayBook, using it as a hardware template for the Kindle Fire. First-generation Kindle Fire devices employed a 1-GHz Texas Instruments OMAP 4430 dual-core processor. The device has a 2-point multi-touch colour LCD screen with a diagonal length of 7 inches (180 mm) and a 600×1024-pixel resolution (160 dpi density). Connectivity is through 802.11n Wi-Fi and USB 2.0 (Micro-B connector). The device includes 8 GB of internal storage—said to be enough for 80 applications, plus either 10 movies or 800 songs or 6,000 books. According to Amazon, the first-generation Kindle Fire's 4400 mAh battery sustains up to 8 hours of consecutive reading and up to 7.5 hours of video playback with wireless off; later generations all offered around 7–8 hours

Of the 8 GB internal storage available in the first-generation Kindle Fire, approximately 6.5 GB was available for content.

The first-generation Kindle Fire has a sensor on the upper left-hand corner of the screen. This was widely considered to be an ambient-light sensor, disabled since an early software upgrade.

Colour display technologies consume much more power than monochrome electronic paper (E-ink) types; Fire offer a typical battery life of 8 hours of mixed usage, while monochrome Kindles offer 15 to 30 hours' use without WiFi—"battery lasts weeks on a single charge"—with a much lower-capacity battery.

=== Software ===
The first generation of Kindle Fire devices run a customised Android 2.3.3 Gingerbread OS. The second-generation Kindle Fire HD runs a customised Android 4.0.3 Ice Cream Sandwich OS. Along with access to Amazon Appstore, the Fire includes a cloud-accelerated "split browser", Amazon Silk, using Amazon EC2 for off-device cloud computation; including webpage layout and rendering, and Google's SPDY protocol for faster webpage content transmission. The user's Amazon digital content is given free storage in Amazon Cloud's web-storage platform, 5 GB music storage in Amazon Cloud Drive, and a built-in email application allows webmail (Gmail, Yahoo!, Hotmail, AOL Mail, etc.) to be merged into one inbox. The subscription-based Amazon Prime, which includes unlimited streaming of movies and TV shows, is available with a free 30-day trial period.

Content formats supported by the first-generation Kindle Fire were Kindle Format 8 (KF8), Kindle Mobi (.azw), TXT, PDF, unrestricted MOBI, PRC natively, Audible (Audible Enhanced (AA, AAX)), DOC, DOCX, JPEG, GIF, PNG, BMP, PSD, EPUB non-DRM AAC, MP3, MIDI, OGG, WAV, MP4, VP8.

Because of Amazon's USB driver implementation, the first-generation Kindle Fire suffered from slow USB transfer speeds. For example, transferring an 800MB video file may have taken more than three minutes in 2011.

It is possible to convert a Kindle Fire to a tablet running standard Android, with some loss of Amazon-related functionality, and lacking features such as Bluetooth, microphone, camera, and memory expansion.

In May 2022, Amazon announced the company were updating the foundation of the Fire Operating System. Amazon's next Fire 7 Tablet will come with the company's Fire OS called Fire OS 8, while Fire OS 7 has run on Android 9 since 2018, Fire OS 8 will be based on Android 11, described in the press as "a pretty significant upgrade to the foundational software currently powering Amazon tablets." With this development the company aims to introduce new user features such as a system-wide dark mode.

== Reception ==
Analysts had projected the device to be a strong competitor to Apple's iPad, and that other Android device makers would suffer lost sales.

In a 2012 review published by Project Gutenberg, the Kindle Fire was called a "huge step back in freedom from the Kindle 3"; the reviewer noted that Amazon introduced a "deliberate limitation" into the Fire that did not exist in the previous version: it is no longer possible to download free e-books from websites such as Project Gutenberg, Internet Archive, and Google Books and have them stored permanently in the same places where books from Amazon are kept.

== Sales ==
Customers began receiving Kindle Fires on November 15, 2011; in December 2012, customers had purchased over a million Kindle devices per week. International Data Corporation (IDC) estimated that the Kindle Fire sold about 4.7 million units during the fourth quarter of 2011.

The Amazon Kindle Fire helped the company beat their 2012 first quarter estimates and boosted the company's stock in extended trading. As of May 2013, about 7 million units had been sold according to estimates. Statistics for FY2014 or Q1&2 2015 are not yet available.

== Family ==
There have been many generations of Fire tablets spread across three different feature design lines: Fire, Fire HD, and Fire HDX.

Beyond the tablet devices, Fire is also used for a range of media devices and for one generation of smart phone.

== Models ==
Overview on generations and models for all Fire (including Fire HD) tablet devices:

Display Size (Diag.) Generation (Year)	6 in	7 in	8 in	8.9 in	10.1 in	11 in
1st (2011)		Kindle Fire				
2nd (2012)		Kindle Fire; Kindle Fire HD				
2.5th (2012)				Kindle Fire HD WiFi; Kindle Fire HD WAN		
3rd (2013)		Kindle Fire; Kindle Fire HD WiFi; Kindle Fire HD WAN	Kindle Fire HD WiFi; Kindle Fire HD WAN			
4th (2014)	Fire HD	Fire HD		Fire HDX WiFi; Fire HDX WAN		
5th (2015)		Fire 7	Fire HD 8		Fire HD 10	
6th (2016)			Fire HD 8			
7th (2017)		Fire 7	Fire HD 8		Fire HD 10	
8th (2018)			Fire HD 8			
9th (2019)		Fire 7			Fire HD 10	
10th (2020)			Fire HD 8 Fire HD 8+			
11th (2021)					Fire HD 10; Fire HD 10+	
12th (2022)		**Fire 7**	Fire HD 8 Fire HD 8+			
13th (2023)					**Fire HD 10**	**Fire Max 11**
12th (2024)			**Fire HD 8**			

Note: Items in bold are currently available.

Detailed specifications for Fire tablets:

Kindle Fire models (2011 - 2013)

Generation (within Amazon Fire tablets)		1st (2011)	2nd (2012)
Model		Kindle Fire	
Code name		Otter/Blaze	Otter2
Model Number		D01400	KFOT
Release date		November 15, 2011	September 14, 2012
Status		Discontinued	Discontinued
OS		Fire OS 1 based on Android 2.3.3	Fire OS 2.4(?) based on Android 4.0.3
System Version		6.3.4	10.5.1
Fire OS (latest)		2.4	3.1
Screen	Size (diagonal)	7"	
Screen	Resolution	1024 × 600	
Screen	Density	169 ppi	
CPU	Maker	Texas Instruments	
CPU	Kind	Dual-core OMAP4	
CPU	Model	4430 HS	
CPU	Cores	2× ARM Cortex-A9 @ 1.0 GHz	2× ARM Cortex-A9 @ 1.2 GHz
CPU	Width	32-bit	
GPU	Designer	Imagination Technologies	
GPU	Kind	PowerVR	
GPU	Model	SGX540	
GPU	Clock	304 MHz	384 MHz
Storage	RAM	512 MiB	1 GiB
Storage	Internal	8 GB	
Camera		—N/a	
Microphone		—N/a	
Bluetooth		—N/a	
Wireless	Wi-Fi	802.11 b/g/n	
Location		—N/a	Wi-Fi based
Accelerometer		Yes	
Weight		413 g (14.6 oz)	400 g (14 oz)
Dimensions		190 × 120 × 11.4 mm (7.48 × 4.72 × 0.45 in)	189 × 120 × 11.5 mm (7.44 × 4.72 × 0.45 in)
Battery	Capacity	4400 mA⋅h	
Battery	Life (up to)	?	
Legend: Unsupported Supported **Latest version**

Amazon Fire models (2014 and newer)

Generation (within Amazon Fire tablets)		5th (2015)	7th (2017)	9th (2019)	12th (2022)
Model		Fire	Fire 7		
Code name		Ford	Austin	Mustang	Quartz
Model Number		KFFOWI	KFAUWI	KFMUWI	KFQUWI
Release date		September 30, 2015	June 7, 2017	June 6, 2019	June 29, 2022
Status		Discontinued	Discontinued	Supported	Current
OS		Fire OS 5.0.1 based on Android 5.1.1	Fire OS 5.3.6 based on Android 5.1.1	Fire OS 6.3.0 based on Android 7.1	Fire OS 8 based on Android 11
Fire OS (latest)		5.7.1.0		7.3.2.9	8.3.3.3
Screen	Size (diagonal)	7"			
Screen	Resolution	1024 × 600			
Screen	Density	171 ppi			
CPU	Maker	MediaTek			
CPU	Kind	Quad-core			
CPU	Model	MT8127B		MT8163V/B (in 32-bit mode)	MT8168V/B
CPU	Cores	4× ARM Cortex-A7 @ 1.3 GHz		4× ARM Cortex-A53 @ 1.3 GHz	4× ARM Cortex-A53 @ 2.0 GHz
CPU	Width	32-bit			64-bit & 32-bit
GPU	Designer	ARM Holdings			
GPU	Kind	Mali			
GPU	Model	450	450 MP4	T720 MP2	G52 3EE MC1
GPU	Clock	600 MHz	600 MHz	520 MHz	800 MHz
Storage	RAM	1 GiB			2 GiB
Storage	Internal	8 GB or 16 GB		16 GB or 32 GB	
Storage	External	At least up to 128 GB microSDXC	At least up to 256 GB microSDXC	At least up to 512 GB microSDXC	At least up to 1 TB microSDXC
Camera	Back	2 MP			
Camera	Front	0.3 MP VGA			2 MP
Microphone		Yes			
Bluetooth		Bluetooth 4.0 LE	Bluetooth 4.1 LE		Bluetooth 5.0 LE
Wireless	Wi-Fi	802.11 b/g/n	802.11 a/b/g/n (dual band)		802.11 a/b/g/n/ac (dual band)
Location		Wi-Fi based			
Accelerometer		Yes			
Weight		313 g (11.0 oz)	295 g (10.4 oz)	286 g (10.1 oz)	282 g (9.9 oz)
Dimensions		191 × 115 × 10.6 mm (7.52 × 4.53 × 0.42 in)	192 × 115 × 9.6 mm (7.56 × 4.53 × 0.38 in)	192 × 115 × 9.6 mm (7.56 × 4.53 × 0.38 in)	180.7 × 117.6 × 9.7 mm (7.11 × 4.63 × 0.38 in)
Battery	Capacity	2980 mA⋅h	2980 mA⋅h	3200 mA⋅h	3750 mA⋅h
Battery	Life (up to)	7 hours	8 hours	7 hours	10 hours
Legend: Unsupported Supported **Latest version**

== Gallery ==
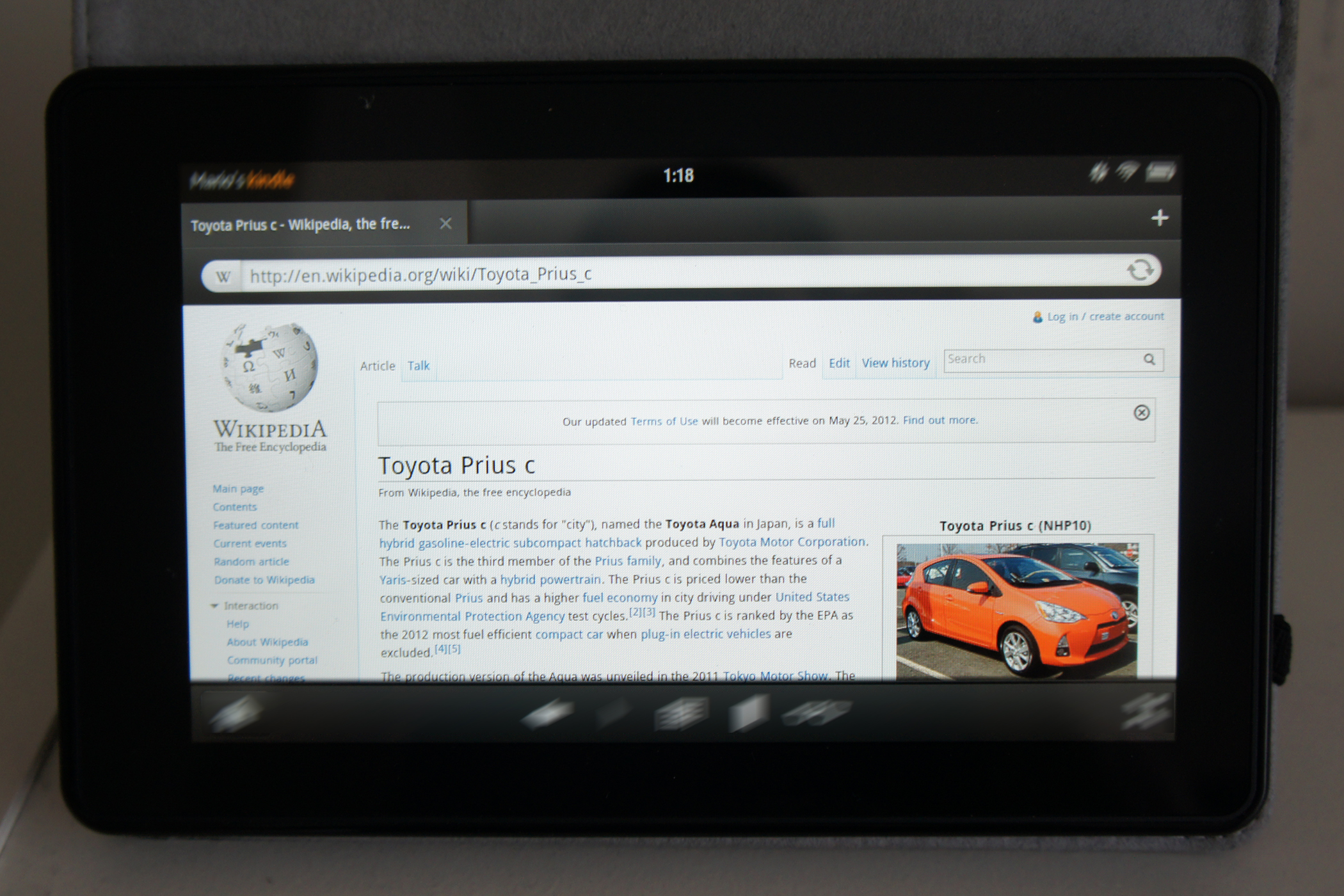
The Kindle Fire in horizontal position displaying web page

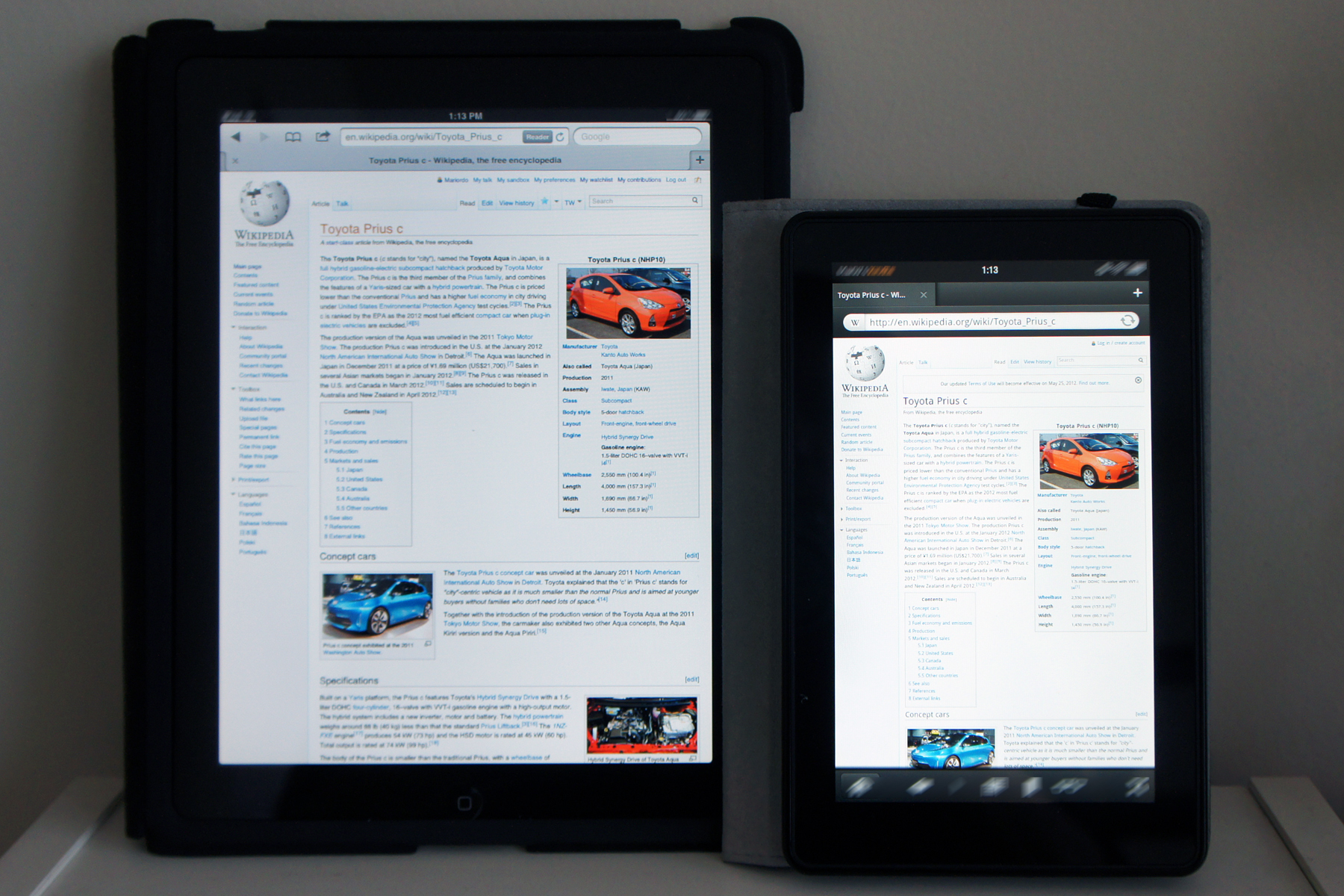
The iPad (left) compared with the Kindle Fire (right)

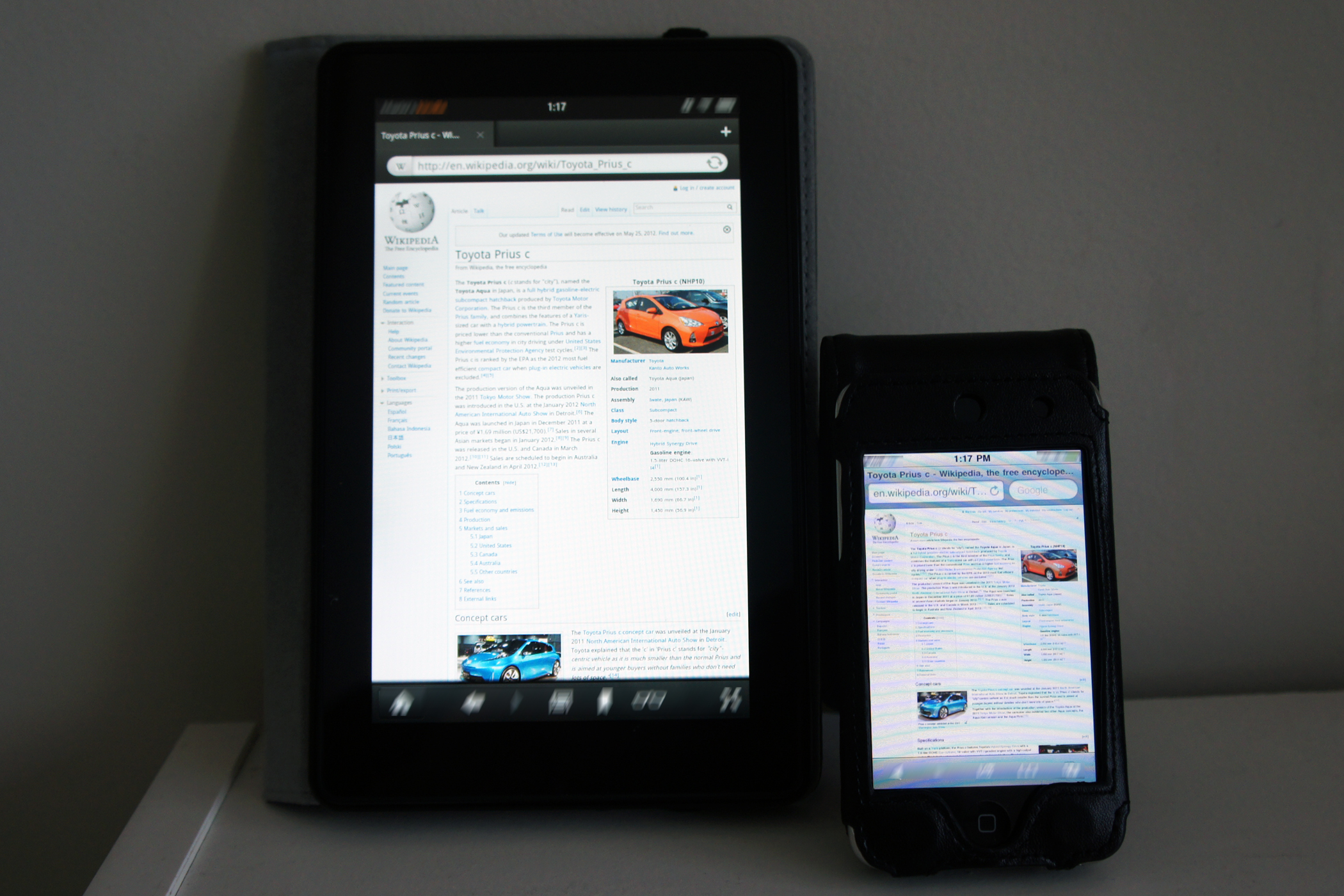
The Kindle Fire (left) compared with the iPod Touch (right)

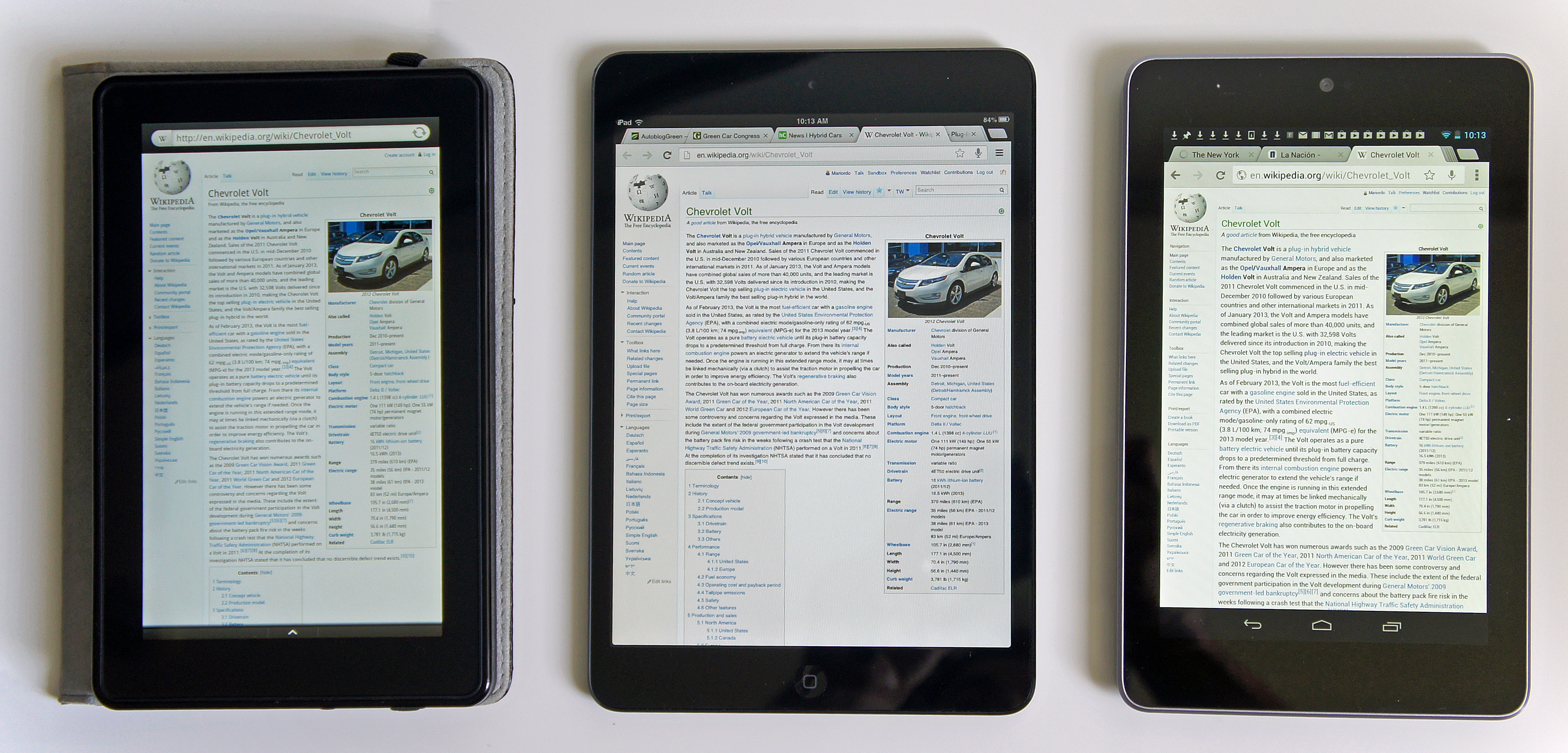
The Kindle Fire (left) compared with the iPad Mini (center) and the Nexus 7 (2012 version) (right)

== Timeline ==
Timeline of Amazon Fire tablet models

Disclaimer: The discontinuation dates may not be precise.

== See also ==
- Fire HD, the "mid-market" version of the Kindle Fire, running Android in early models and Fire OS since the 4th generation.
- Fire HDX, the "high-end" version of the Kindle Fire, running Fire OS in all models.
- Comparison of:
  - Tablet computers
  - E-book readers
