= Google Developer Day =

Google promotional events for developers

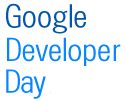
- Logo
- Frequency: annually
- Organizer: organized by Google
- Website: www.google.com/events/developerday

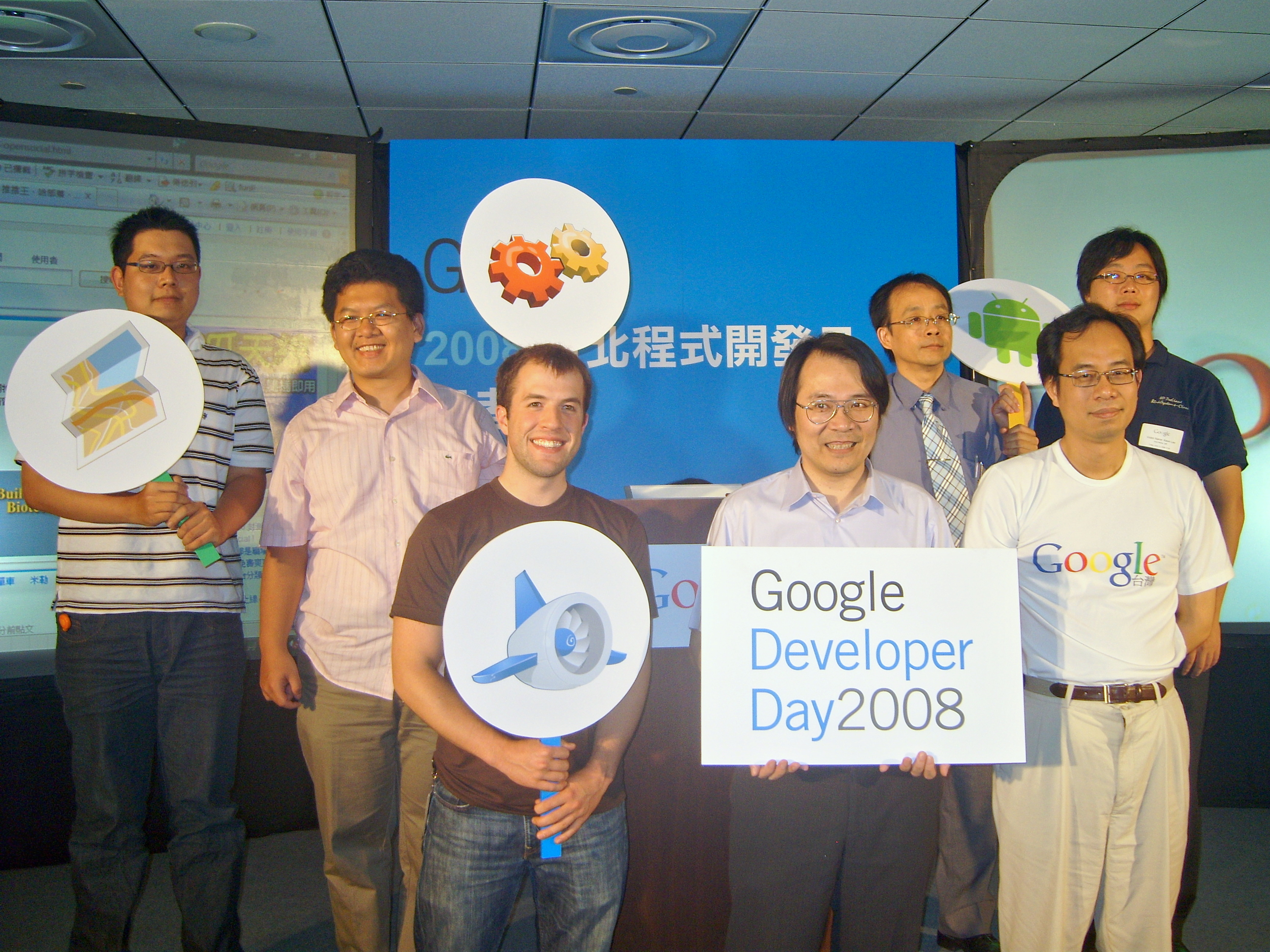
Google Developer Day 2008 in Taiwan

Google Developer Day events were one-day web developer-focused gatherings around the world held annually by Google. They include seminars and codelabs focused on building of web, mobile, and enterprise applications with Google and open web technologies such as Android, HTML5, Chrome, App Engine, Google Web Toolkit and give participants a chance to learn about Google developer products and meet Google engineers.

== Occurrences ==
- 2007: May - June in Mountain View, California USA, São Paulo, Brazil, London, United Kingdom, Paris, France, Madrid, Spain, Hamburg, Germany, Moscow, Russia, Tokyo, Japan, Sydney, Australia, and Beijing, China.
- 2008: Jun 10 in Yokohama, Japan, Jun 12 in Beijing, China, Jun 14 in Taipei, Taiwan, Jun 18 in Sydney, Australia, Jun 23 in Mexico City, Mexico, Jun 27 in São Paulo, Brazil, Sep 16 in London, United Kingdom, Sep 18 in Paris, France, Sep 23 in Munich, Germany, Sep 25 in Madrid, Spain, Oct 18 in Bangalore, India, Oct 21 in Milan, Italy, Oct 24 in Prague, Czech Republic, Oct 28 in Moscow, Russia, Nov 2 in Tel Aviv, Israel.
- 2009: Jun 5 in Beijing, China, Jun 9 in Yokohama, Japan, Jun 29 in São Paulo, Brazil, Nov 6 in Prague, Czech Republic, Nov 10 in Moscow, Russia.
- 2010: Sep 28 in Tokyo, Japan, Oct 29 in São Paulo, Brazil, Nov 9 in Munich, Germany, Nov 12 in Moscow, Russia, and Nov 16 in Prague, Czech Republic.
- 2011: Sep 16 in São Paulo, Brazil, Sep 19–20 in Buenos Aires, Argentina, Oct 10 in Moscow, Russia, Oct 18 in Prague, Czech Republic, Oct 26 in Beijing, China, Nov 1 in Tokyo, Japan, Nov 3 in Shanghai, Nov 8 in Sydney, Australia, Nov 11 in Guangzhou, Nov 13 in Tel Aviv, Israel, Nov 19 in Berlin, Germany.
- 2016: Sep 5 & 6 in Europe; Dec 7 in Beijing.
- 2017: Dec 13 & 14 in Shanghai.
- 2018: Sep 20 & 21 in Shanghai.
- 2019: Sep 10 & 11 in Shanghai.

== Aims ==
Developer Days are a marketing technique used by Google to launch new products and introduce customers to innovations often presenting these in the form of games. It also seeks to encourage the participation of software developers and to attract developers who can improve web applications. A stated company goal is to "cultivate a better relationship with programmers, particularly those on the cutting edge of mashup development, a relatively new style of application development that combines information from different Web sites." Such developer programs are becoming a common feature of how companies promote Web applications and are used by Amazon, eBay, Microsoft, and Yahoo. In fact, Yahoo was a pioneer in the introduction developer days with its Hack Day in autumn 2006.

== History ==
- 2007: The first Developer Day event took place in Sydney, Australia, followed by nine other international locations. It provided talks and demonstrations for Gears, Web toolkit, Geo, Mapplets together with a YouTube API session writeup.
- 2008: Google unveiled its HTC Android phone. It also included presentations on Chrome, AJAX and the Web Toolkit and demos for various applications such as Gears.
- 2011: The largest per-country GDD took place in China: within a month, 3 GDD events took place, in the cities of Beijing, Shanghai, and Guangzhou, with more than 3,000 developer attendees.
- 2014: Google showcases its smart watch at its annual Development Day in San Francisco.

== See also ==
- Google I/O
- Android Developer Day
