= Amazon Silk =

Web browser for Amazon Fire

- Amazon Silk's secondary app icon

- Amazon Silk browser running on an Amazon Fire
- Developer: Amazon.com
- Initial release: November 15, 2011; 14 years ago
- Engine: Blink, V8
- Operating system: Fire OS
- Available in: English, Spanish, French, Italian, Japanese, Chinese
- Type: Mobile browser
- License: Freeware, proprietary
- Website: docs.aws.amazon.com/silk

Amazon Silk is a web browser developed by Amazon. It was launched in November 2011 for Amazon Fire and Fire Phone, and a Fire TV version was launched in November 2017. Amazon Silk was announced for the Echo Show in September 2018, and subsequently added the same month.

The browser utilizes a split architecture where some of the processing is performed on Amazon's servers to improve a website's loading performance. Based on Google's open-source Chromium project, Silk uses the Blink and V8 engines for displaying webpages and executing JavaScript.

== Architecture ==
For each page request, Silk dynamically decides whether networking, HTML parsing, and rendering tasks are handled locally or offloaded to Amazon EC2 servers.

Silk utilizes Google's SPDY protocol to enhance browsing speed. Silk provides SPDY performance benefits to websites that don’t natively support SPDY when pages are routed through Amazon’s servers. Some early reviewers found that cloud-based acceleration did not necessarily improve page loading speed, most notably on faster connections or for simpler web pages.

Privacy organizations, including the Electronic Frontier Foundation, raised concerns with Amazon passing Silk traffic through its own servers, effectively operating as an Internet service provider for users of the browser. Silk includes an option to disable Amazon's server-side processing. On July 26, 2016, it was reported that Silk prevented access to Google over HTTPS, though this issue has been resolved.

Silk operates under the user Amazon account associated with the device. To access resources from another web account, external utility apps are available, e.g. to use Chrome bookmarks from a desktop or mobile web account.

== Name ==
Amazon in the past has stated "a thread of silk is an invisible yet incredibly strong connection between two different things", and thus calls the browser Amazon Silk as it represents the connection between Kindle Fire and Amazon's EC2 servers.

== See also ==
- History of web browsers
- List of web browsers
- Google Chrome
- Opera Mini
- Opera Turbo
- MarioNet split web browser
- Brave
