= Amazon Alexa Tablet =

Tablet computer brand introduced in 2026

- Developer: Amazon.com
- Type: Tablet
- Released: October 8, 2026
- Website: Alexa Tablet

The Amazon Alexa Tablet is a brand of tablet computer developed and marketed by Amazon. They are designed to integrate Amazon Alexa+ into the Android operating system. The tablets are the successors to and replacement for the Amazon Fire and Amazon Fire HD lines of tablets.

== Models ==
=== Detailed specifications for all Alexa Tablet devices ===
Generation (within Alexa Tablets)		1st Generation (2026)		
Model		Alexa Tablet 8	Alexa Tablet 11	Alexa Tablet 12 Pro
Code name		roselite	turquoise	spinel
Model number		ATROWI (4 GB) ATROUWI (8 GB)	ATTQUWI	ATSPWI (8 GB) ATSPUWI (16 GB)
Release date		October 14, 2026		
Status		Current	Current	Current
Android OS	Version (Latest)	16		
Android OS	API Level	36		
Screen	Size (diagonal)	8.7 in	11 in	11.95 in
Screen	Resolution	1340 x 800	2560 x 1600	2800 × 1840
Screen	Density	180 PPI	276 PPI	280 PPI
Screen	Type	IPS		
Stylus			USI 2.0	USI 2.0 (magnetic attach and charge)
CPU	Maker	MediaTek		
CPU	Kind	Octocore		
CPU	Model	MT8189		MT8793N
CPU	Cores	2xA78 @ 2.0 GHz 6xA55 @ 2.0 GHz		1x A725 @ 3.25 GHz 1 MB L2 2x A725 @ 3.0 GHz 512 KB L2 4x A725 2.1 GHz 256 KB L2
CPU	Width	64-bit		
GPU	Designer	Arm Holdings		
GPU	Kind	Mali (processor)		
GPU	Model	G57 MC2		G720
GPU	Clock	880 MHz		
RAM		4 GB 8 GB	8 GB	8 GB 16 GB
Storage	Internal	64 GB 128 GB	64 GB 128 GB	128 GB UFS 3.1 256 GB UFS 4.0
Storage	External	—N/a		
Camera	Back	8 MP	8 MP	13 MP
Camera	Front	5 MP	8 MP	8 MP
Microphone		Single	Dual	
Bluetooth		5.3 BLE		
Wireless	Wi-Fi	Wi-Fi 6	Wi-Fi 6	Wi-Fi 6E
Location	Wi-Fi	WiFi-based		
Light sensor		Yes		
Accelerometer		Yes		
Gyroscope		No		Yes
Proximity		Yes	No	
Weight		329 g (11.61 oz)	446 g (15.73 oz)	550 g (1.21 lb)
Dimensions		-	-	6.5 mm thickness
Battery		4600 mAh	6500 mAh	9000 mAh
Legend: Unsupported Supported Latest version

The Model number consists of multiple parts: the AT prefix for 'Alexa Tablet', one or two letters derived from the code name, a U for models with upgraded RAM, then WI for Wi-Fi.
