= Android Developer Day =

Google event

- The Android robot, a character developed by the Android™ to be used in marketing
- Location: worldwide
- Organizer: organized by Google, Inc., GDG groups and Tech communities.
- Website: www.androiddeveloperdays.com

Android Developer Days (ADD) is an open conference held at various locations worldwide each year. The Android Developer Days conference is a growing organization that allows developers of various software and applications to showcase, observe, and participate in Android Developing events, such as informational lectures, workshops, entertainment activities, panel discussions, and networking opportunities make up a majority of the Android Developer Days. As an international leader in mobile operating systems, ADD has become increasingly popular as the center for mobile device conventions. Unofficial participants may elect to observe different booths and displays. However, in order to partake in the festivities, one must apply to join the organization. There is an assortment of ways that one is able to join the conference including exhibiting your own presentation, showcasing posters featuring developing applications, or instructing hands-on, interactive coding tutorials. In 2014, the Android Developer Days conventions had been held in Ankara, Turkey, from May 16 to May 17.

== History ==
Android Developer Days were created to discuss and share technological developments happening throughout the world by the best Android Developers around the world, with the belief that organized events are beneficial to the information technology field. The Android Developer Days utilizes the positive effect of synergy. Synergy which, in this case, is the collaboration and sharing of ideas and products in order to form a greater effect than their own individual effect. An international level organization provides more information, experience, and inspiration for participants because synergy is involved. In addition, Android Developer Days aim to inspire developers of the future trends in the field, helping to create international products and brands.

=== 2012 Convention ===
The inaugural Android Developer Day took place at Middle East Technical University's Cultural and Convention Center in Ankara, Turkey, as an extension of a similar event, Google Developer Day. The first ADD began on May 21, 2012, and ended the following day after approximately 30 presentations between two simultaneous sessions. In addition, 120 of the roughly 700 attendees participated in 6 workshops discussing mobile technology developments and predicting future trends of its development. Some examples of topics covered in the workshops include "Areas of HTML5 usage and Reasons," "How to use Facebook and Google accounts in Apps," and "Native or Web App Which one?". The event was made possible by 3 platinum, 2 silver, and 9 product sponsors, including General Mobile Inc., Huawei, and ASELSAN.

=== 2013 Convention ===
The subsequent ADD returned to Ankara, Turkey, on June 14, 2013. The two-day conference, taking 9 months to prepare, featured talks from guest speakers representing the Android community, such as Android community such as, Lars Vogel, Eric Lafortune, Bernd Schulze, Mark Allison. Over 1,000 people attended the event, along with 65 guest speakers, 20 of whom came from abroad. The event was supported by 15 Google Developer Groups from 7 different countries, and sponsored by 26 technical and entrepreneurial companies. The sessions available for attendees more than doubled from the previous year, with 67 sessions, seminars, workshops and discussions being held in 4 different halls.

==== Sub Events ====
ADD also hosted two sub-events: the Ecahack Hackathon, and an entrepreneurship marathon of the name Innov-a-thon’Lite Turkey. During the Ecahack Hackathon, the Android developers spent an entire 24 hours writing code. There were competitions during the hackathon, and winners received various prizes. The second sub-event was called the Innov-a-thon'Lite Turkey. During this sub-event, which lasted three hours, a Dubai-based seed accelerator program called TURN8 supported innovative ideas by strategizing investment funding and business management techniques.

== 2014 Convention ==
As widely expected, many of the topics covered at the Android Developer Days indeed pertain to Android devices themselves. On top of mentioning Androids in different areas, Android application development, and Android operating systems, the conventions serve to discuss future technologies, new generation mobile devices, and various mobile operating systems. Google is a large benefactor of Android, and consequently many of Google's upcoming inventions involving Google Glass, Google TV, and Google Play are main attractions for the upcoming 2014 ADDs. Other minute topics to be discussed include but are not limited to App Development Best Practises, App Monetization, Ad Integration, In-app Billing, User Statistics, App Development in Mobile Operation Systems, Android NDK, Cross Platform App Development Frameworks, HTML5, JavaScript, Game Development, Communication Solutions, Cloud, Augmented Reality, Social Media, Location-Based Services and Maps, Mobile Education, Mobile Payment Security, Internet of Things, Embedded Systems and Single Board Devices, Big Data Processing Optimizations in Mobile Devices, Software Development, Methodologies, Success Stories, and GWT. The 2014 convention takes place at the Metu Cultural and Convention Center in Ankara, Turkey. The venue is located at the Middle East Technical University.

=== Participants ===
As mentioned above, anyone is able to present and attend the Android Developer Days. Attendees can register online for free. Furthermore, there are featured speakers, which are selected via an application process on the ADD webpage. The featured speakers in 2014 include:

- Mark Allison: a software engineer with over 30 years of experience, and author of Styling Android, a blog dedicated to the thematic styling of Android applications.
- Tim Messerschmidt: a long-time mobile and web-developer. He works at PayPal and is coordinating their developer activities in Europe.
- Al Sutton: as a professional in selling software and intellectual property, he has been working on projects related to android the last 5 years.
- Abhisek Devkota: the Community Manager and project manager for Cyanogen Inc.
- Juhani Lehtimaki: head of android development at Snapp TV, has more than ten years of experience in java development, author of Smashing Android UI.
- Thomas Mattson: works at Vaadin as a Vaadin expert and a project manager
- Xavier Hallade: technical marketing engineer at Intel Corporation, focus on wireless displays and native development
- Mustafa Sezgin: director of mobile engineering at SoundCloud
- Stephan Janssen: serial entrepreneur that has founded multiple successful organizations
- Ali Derbane: develops Android software at Itude Mobile
- Benjamin Weiss: Senior Software Developer at ImmobilienScout24
- Mustafa Kasap: works for Microsoft in Turkey developing applications for Windows Phones
- Fatih Isbecer: CEO of Monitise MEA
- Paresh Mayani: Android developer for 10+ years. Organiser @ Google Developers Group Ahmedabad and Founder/CEO, SolGuruz

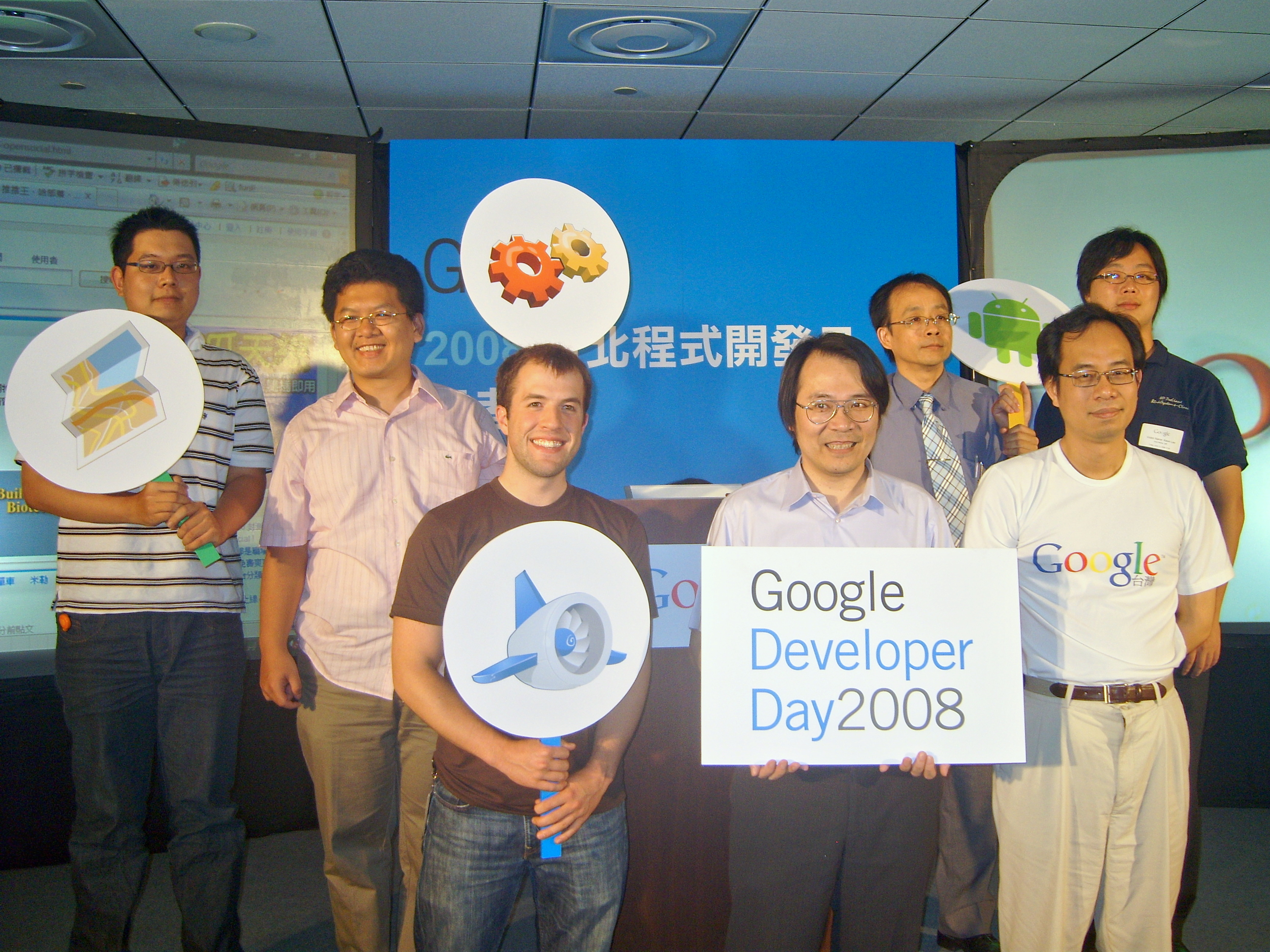
Google Developer Day 2008

== See also ==
- Google I/O
- AtGoogleTalks
- Google Developer Day
- Android Developer Day
