= Fire Phone =

2014 smartphone by Amazon

Amazon Fire Phone

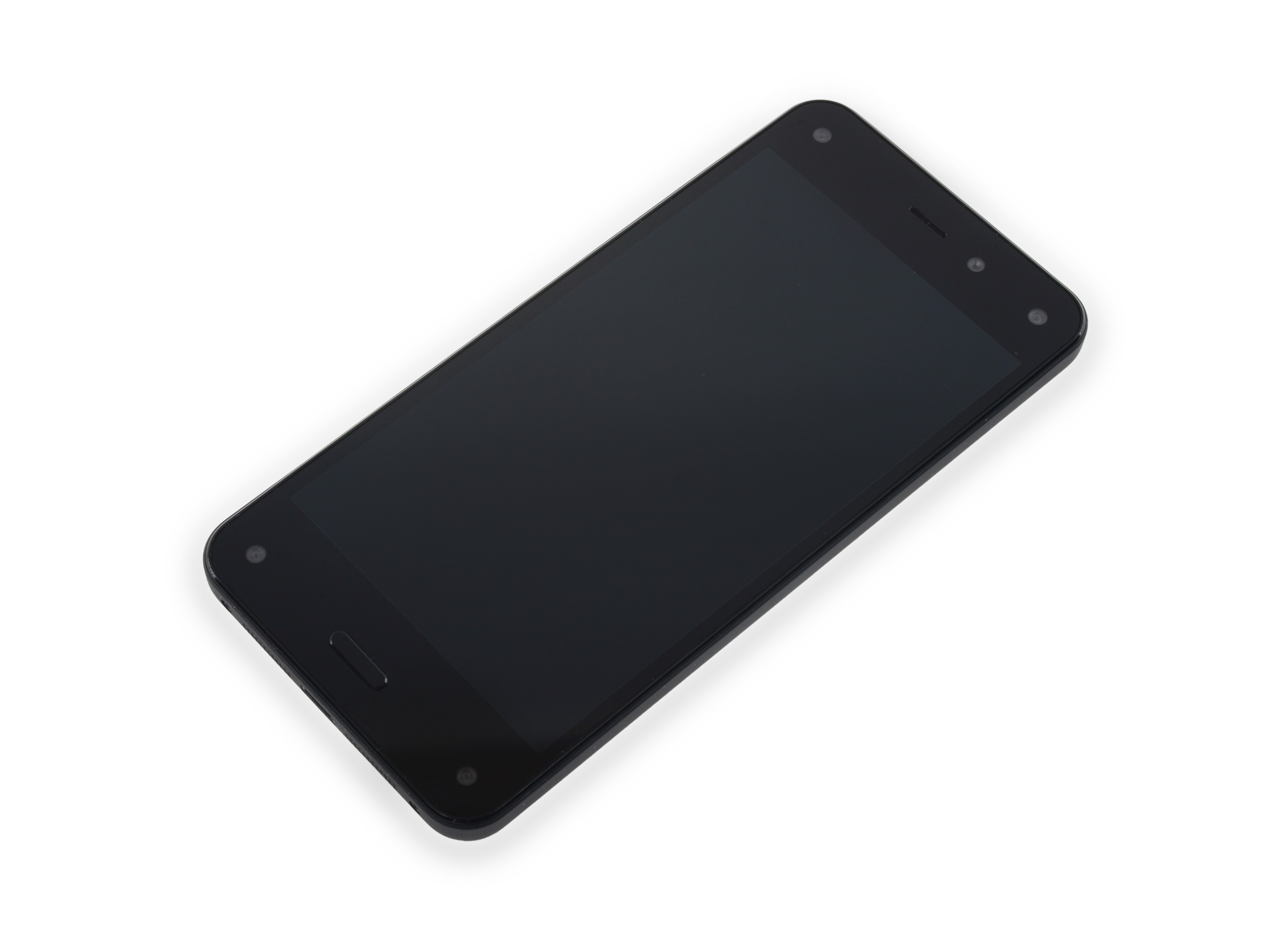
- The Amazon Fire Phone
- Brand: Amazon Fire
- Manufacturer: Foxconn
- Type: Smartphone
- Series: Fire Phone Series
- First released: 25 July 2014; 12 years ago
- Availability by region: United States; United Kingdom; Germany
- Discontinued: 27 August 2015; 11 years ago
- Compatible networks: UMTS/HSPA+/DC-HSDPA (850, 900, 1700/2100, 1900, 2100 MHz), Quad-band GSM/EDGE (850, 900, 1800, 1900 MHz), LTE (Bands 1, 2, 3, 4, 5, 7, 8, 17, 20)
- Form factor: Slate
- Dimensions: 139.2 mm (5.48 in) H 66.5 mm (2.62 in) W 8.9 mm (0.35 in) D
- Weight: 160 g (5.64 oz)
- Operating system: Original Fire OS 3.5; Current Fire OS 4.6.5 (AT&T version), 4.6.6.1 (unlocked version).
- System-on-chip: Qualcomm Snapdragon 800
- CPU: 2.26 GHz quad-core Krait 400
- GPU: Adreno 330
- Memory: 2 GB RAM
- Storage: 32 or 64 GB
- Battery: 2400 mAh
- Rear camera: 13 MP CMOS sensor with OIS
- Front camera: 2.1 MP
- Display: 4.7 in (120 mm) IPS LCD; Gorilla Glass 3; 1280×720 px (315 ppi)
- Connectivity: Bluetooth 3.0; GPS; Micro USB; NFC; Wi-Fi 802.11 a/b/g/n/ac

The Fire Phone is a discontinued 3D-enabled smartphone developed by Amazon and manufactured by Foxconn. It was announced on June 18, 2014, and marked Amazon's first foray into the smartphone market, following the success of the Kindle Fire. It was available for pre-order on the day it was announced. In the United States, it launched as an AT&T exclusive on July 25.

Notable for its hallmark feature "Dynamic Perspective" using five front-facing cameras and the gyroscope to track the user's movements, the phone's Fire OS adjusts the UI so it gives the impression of depth and 3D. Other notable Amazon services on the phone include X-Ray, used for identifying and finding information about media; Mayday, the 24-hour customer service tool; and Firefly, a tool for automatically recognizing text, sounds, and objects, and offering a way to buy recognized items through Amazon's online store.

The phone received mixed reviews. Critics praised the Dynamic Perspective, Firefly and, to a lesser extent, the packaged headphones, but derided the build, design, Fire OS version of Android, specifications, and exclusivity to AT&T. Amazon does not release sales figures for any of its devices, but based in part on its quickly declining prices and an announced US$170 million write-down, analysts have judged it a commercial failure. Amazon ceased production of the Fire Phone in August 2015 and discontinued sales soon after.

== History ==
=== Development ===
The Fire Phone was rumored to be under development for several years prior to its release. Amazon reportedly started work on the phone in 2010, showing a prototype to AT&T in 2011. The first mention of a possible phone designed by Amazon appeared August 2010 in the New York Times, with a source within Lab 126 claiming; "entering the mobile phone market… seemed out of Amazon's reach. But… Amazon had not definitively rejected the idea of building a phone in the future." Shortly thereafter, some claimed Amazon might purchase WebOS from Hewlett-Packard, using its software and patents to create an Amazon phone. According to current and former employees of the company, the project for the Fire Phone started after Apple announced the iPhone 4 in 2010, and was codenamed "Tyto" for a genus of owl. Jeff Bezos reportedly "...envisioned a list of whiz-bang features... NFC for contactless payments, hands-free interactions to allow users to navigate the interface through mid-air gestures and a force-sensitive grip that could respond in different ways to various degrees of physical pressure", most of which ultimately did not end up in the final product. He also "obsessively monitored the product", requiring "even the smallest decisions needed to go by him". Frustration built up over what appeared to Lab126 workers to be extraneous features such as Dynamic Perspective, although they continued to work on the project due to the money being paid to them by Jeff Bezos.

Later, in 2012, The Wall Street Journal contended that Amazon was testing a smartphone, with a screen size between four and five inches. Bloomberg also reported Amazon as looking to acquire patents in order to defend against allegations of infringement concerning the use of wireless technology of the phone. The Verge claimed "multiple sources" confirming the existence of the Amazon phone and it would be announced alongside the updated Kindle Fire and Kindle Paperwhite in September.

In 2013, reports claimed Amazon would partner with HTC to create a "Kindle Phone" which would be free with Amazon Prime membership. Amazon denied these rumors, stating that the company "will not launch a phone this year" and that if it did, it "would not be free". It continued to develop its phone while denying such rumours, and by 2013, it had split into two projects: "Duke" and "Otus". "Duke" was intended to be the higher end device in its portfolio, while Otus would serve as a low-cost or free (to Amazon Prime members) alternative to Duke. Jeff Bezos later reconsidered, believing only a phone which could set itself apart, could compete against established phone manufactures such as Apple, and a lower-cost, bare-bones phone would hurt the Amazon brand. Although many rumors were not accurate, several final specs, the use of 3D, and the release date were correctly reported.

=== Release ===
The phone was introduced in Seattle in the Fremont Studios, at a press event held by Amazon's CEO, Jeff Bezos. As a limited time promotion, buyers were offered a year of Amazon Prime and 1,000 Amazon coins with the purchase of a Fire Phone. Amazon's Fire Phone was priced at $199 for the 32 GB version and $299 for the 64 GB version on AT&T (with a two-year contract). The pricing range puts it on the same playing field with Android and Apple flagship smartphones. Six weeks after the introduction of the phone to the market, its price with a two-year contract was cut from $199 to $0.99 and the off-contract price went from $650 down to $449. In November 2014 the price for the unlocked version dropped to $199 and even further to $179 in April 2015. After a further price drop to $130 in August 2015, the device eventually was listed as unavailable on the Amazon site. On 27 August 2015, the "Phandroid" website reported that Amazon had discontinued the Fire Phone.

In 2026, Amazon created a new initiative internally known as "Transformer," aiming to create a new mobile device that integrates with the Alexa voice assistant.

== Specifications ==
=== Hardware ===
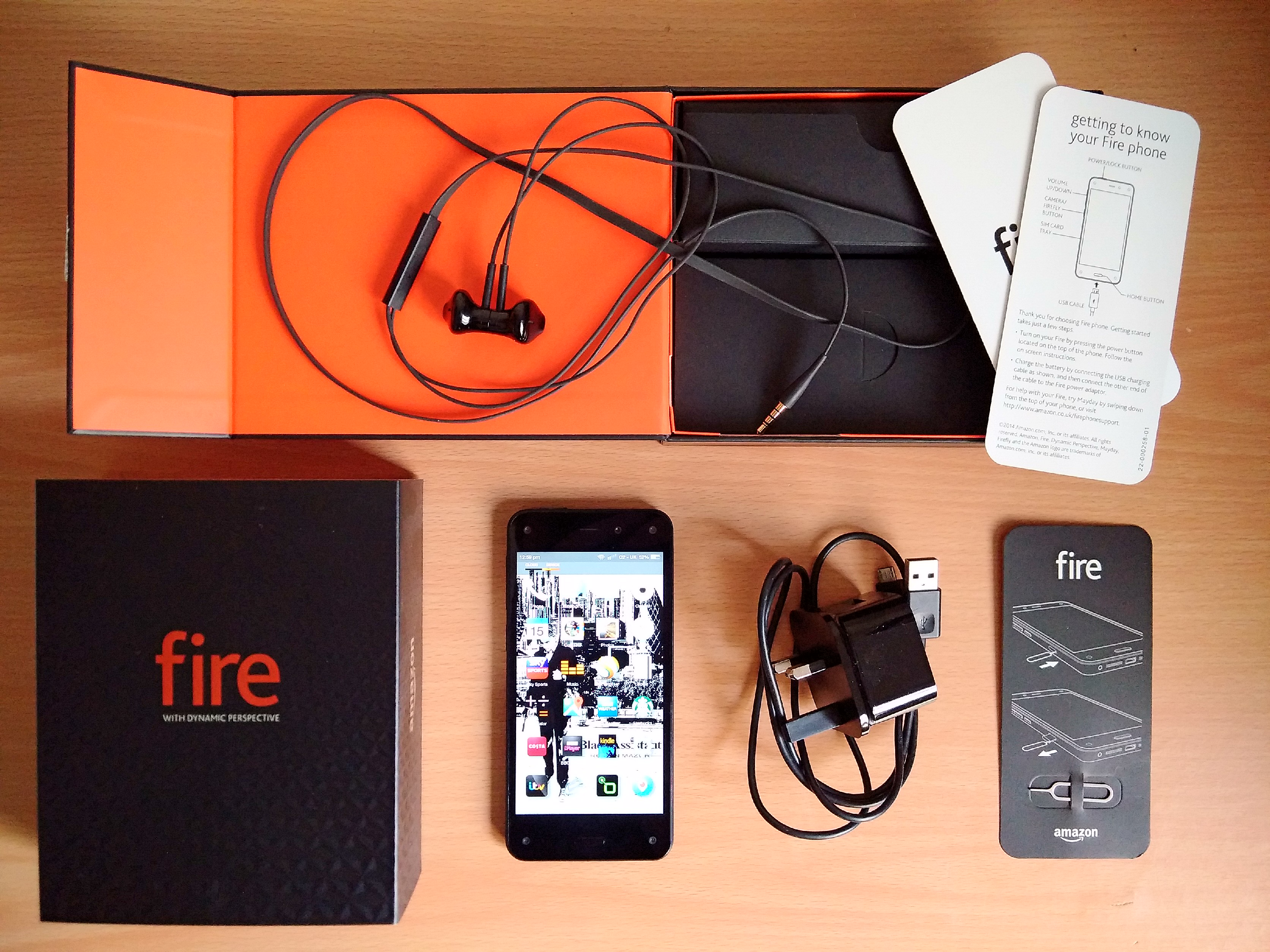
British market 32 GB version unboxed

The Fire Phone uses a 4.7-inch IPS LCD Gorilla Glass 3 polarized touchscreen display with a pixel density of 315 ppi. Its front features the screen and a rounded rectangular home button below the display. The back, made of the same Gorilla Glass, houses the camera, LED flash, and secondary microphone. The sides of the phone are made of a soft touch plastic. On the top of the phone there is a lock/power button and a 3.5 mm jack for headphones. The left side of the device has 3 buttons made of anodized aluminum: two volume buttons and a camera shortcut button. When the camera button is pressed, the camera app opens; when held down, Firefly is opened. The bottom of the phone has the primary microphone, a micro-USB connector port, and dual stereo speakers with Dolby Digital sound processing.

The phone uses a Snapdragon 800 chip paired with an Adreno 330 GPU and 2 GB of RAM. Internal storage is non-expandable, with options of 32 GB or 64 GB. The rear camera is a 13 MP CMOS sensor with an f/2.0 five-element wide aperture lens with OIS. The battery is non-removable and has a capacity of 2400 mAh; Amazon claims this provides up to 22 hours of talk time and up to 85 hours of standby time.

The head tracking "dynamic perspective" camera array used a set of four low-resolution wide angle (120°) IR cameras and IR illuminators, synchronised with a global camera shutter. The computer vision algorithms were executed on a dedicated custom low power processor.

According to the product teardown site iFixit, the BOM of the Fire Phone is estimated to be approximately $205; this figure is higher than the IPhone 5S but lower than the Samsung Galaxy S5.

=== Accessories ===
Included with the phone are earbuds Amazon claims to be "tangle-free"; the earbud tips can be attached to each other magnetically and also have a flat cable in order to minimize tangling. These earbuds can be purchased separately as a standalone accessory. Also included with the phone are the USB cable and power adaptor, as well as a quick start guide. The phone is available only in black, but first-party cases can be purchased in black/cayenne leather or black/cayenne/citron/blue/royal polyurethane.

=== Operating system and software ===
Similar to the Kindle Fire tablets, the Fire Phone uses a forked version of Android called Fire OS. The Fire Phone was preloaded with version 3.5 of Fire OS, which is based on Android 4.2 Jelly Bean. The fork replaces Google's default UI with a carousel of recently accessed content and apps (called "Home Carousel"), and also serves to promote Amazon's various services. A new feature introduced with the Fire Phone is the presence of "active widgets", widgets underneath the icon showing recent activity and/or information about the app. Pre-loaded applications on the Fire Phone include Amazon Appstore, Amazon Video, Amazon Music, Amazon's Silk browser, and Audible Audiobooks. Although the phone uses Android, it does not have Google Play Store pre-installed. As of Fire OS 3.6.8, Google Play and Google Services can be easily sideloaded. An update, Fire OS 3.5.1, brought quick app switching (dubbed "Quick Switch" and accessed by tapping twice on the home button), folders (dubbed "App Grid Collections"), pinning of apps on the home screen, improved photo taking capabilities, sending of high resolution videos via MMS, and improved battery life.

An example of the three-panel design on the home screen of the Fire Phone: The navigation menu on the left, the app menu in the center, and the notification panel on the right.

Also introduced with the Fire Phone is a three-panel design for apps: the leftmost panel displays settings, the center panel is the main screen for apps, and the rightmost panel is used for "delights" – features specific to an app. The example given at the press conference was the music app: the main panel displays the music playing, the left panel shows navigation and settings, and the right panel shows the "delight" of live song lyrics.

Using the four front cameras and the gyroscope, the Fire Phone provides shortcuts based on the orientation of the device. Marketed as "Dynamic Perspective" with actions such as tilt, swivel, and peek, they allow a user to navigate menus/access shortcuts, view notifications, and reveal quick actions respectively. This also allows a user to scroll through a webpage or flip a page in a book by tilting the phone.

Photos taken with the Fire Phone are automatically backed up to Amazon's Cloud Drive; Amazon offers unlimited photo storage for this device.

Mayday and Firefly are also selling points of the phone. Mayday is a free, 24-hour customer support service for users of Amazon's devices, allowing the customer service access to the device in order to show a user particular functions of their device. Firefly uses the camera and microphone to identify objects that can be bought from Amazon (such as media) or to scan useful information (such as addresses and phone numbers). An update added the ability to translate text, as well as identify famous pieces of art.

The Fire Phone can also send its screen to any Miracast enabled device, including the Fire TV, Xbox, Sony PlayStation 3/4, or select Samsung Smart TVs. It can also function as a second screen.

== Reception ==
=== Critical reception ===
The reception to the Fire Phone was mixed. Although reviewers found Firefly and the Dynamic Perspective features to be significant differentiators, they also noticed several drawbacks. Such drawbacks include the 2013-level technical specs (including the lack of Bluetooth LE), the underdeveloped OS, its high price, and the exclusivity of the device to AT&T's network. The hardware also received a mediocre reception: while some liked the design, others were concerned about the durability of the glass as well as the thickness and weight. However, the headphones were well received by at least one reviewer from Gizmodo, who said that "all cheap headphones should at least be this great."

Engadget's Brad Molen stated, "Although Amazon's debut phone isn't bad, per se, but there's little incentive to switch carriers or platforms to buy it. Its unique features don't provide enough utility, and come at the expense of battery life and performance.". They also criticized the "limited [Amazon] ecosystem", including the lack of frequently used apps available on other platforms. The reviewer gave the phone a final rating of 70 out of 100.

Re/code's Walt Mossberg opined that the Fire Phone is "perfectly suited for people heavily invested in the company's ecosystem… But to top Apple and Samsung, Amazon needs to do better."

David Pierce from The Verge gave the phone a 5.9 out of 10; although praising the phone's picture taking abilities, the "solid" battery life, and "cool ideas like Dynamic Perspective and Firefly", the main drawbacks included the confusing interface, bland design, Firefly's poor accuracy, and the phone's commercialism. He concluded by saying, "Amazon’s first smartphone is a series of interesting ideas in a package that is … much less than the sum of its parts."

Farhad Manjoo of The New York Times compared the phone to "Mr. Pine's purple house" (in which the eponymous character paints his house purple to stand out from others), stating that "Amazon has built a nice, solid, plain white house. You'll love living in it, if you can ignore all the purple." This references the "superficial features" of the Fire Phone, "born of the same superficial impulse", including Dynamic Perspective. He also criticized the phone's appearance, stating it "looked more like a prototype than a finished product." Unlike The Verge, The New York Times felt the interface was "relatively simple to navigate".

The Wall Street Journal's Geoffrey Fowler praised Amazon for "attempting to make inroads which might disrupt the giants", saying the smartphone market needed new ideas. All the same, the reviewer compared the phone's features to "the grown-up equivalent of a 9-year-old riding a bike with his hands in the air" – gimmicks, without much real-world usage. He also stated the battery never lasted for an entire day, a "telephonic cardinal sin".

ZDNet's Zach Whittaker wrote the Fire Phone could be described in 2 ways: a motion sickness inducer, or a gimmicky device at best, but one that has great potential. Unlike other reviewers, he felt the phone was "beautifully constructed" and "easier to hold". Dynamic Perspective, on the other hand, gave him motion sickness and made the text harder to read. He concluded the Fire Phone had strong hardware, but that the software let it down. James Kendrick, another of ZDNet's authors, expressed that the "feature in Fire OS that makes devices so nice to use is the large carousel toward the top of the home screen (..) Fire OS is similar to iOS in one regard in that it hides the power of the OS under the hood. What’s exposed is the part of the OS that makes the Amazon device comforting and easy to use. (..) That’s why Fire OS is better than Android for the majority of smartphone and tablet users."

The Fire Phone has been labeled as the most-polluting phone by Greenpeace, who claims Amazon's servers are powered by non-renewable sources of energy. Amazon disputes these claims, countering Greenpeace's data is incorrect and misleading. This led to a large number of one-star reviews being left on Amazon's website, as a form of protest on the part of Greenpeace activists and/or its supporters.

Technology reviewer and Internet personality Marques Brownlee stated in his Smartphone Awards video the Fire Phone was the "Bust of the Year", saying; "… it wasn't really a good phone in any way, and there was no real reason for people to buy it (..) It just didn't really have anything going for it."

When asked about the perceived flop of the Fire Phone during Business Insider's Ignition conference of 2014, Jeff Bezos defended the product, saying it was a "bold bet", and his company had to take such bets in order to stay relevant. He continued, saying it would "take many iterations", and "some number of years" before getting it right, comparing it to the Kindle line of e-readers.

=== Commercial reception ===
The Fire Phone occupied the number one spot on the "Best Selling" list on Amazon.com, before sales dropped significantly after 2 weeks. Amazon shares dipped by 10%on July 24, 2014, one day prior to its launch on AT&T, due to increased losses incurred by the development of the Fire Phone. On 25 July 2014, several AT&T stores reported little to no sales, although several stores experienced increased foot traffic and interest for the Fire Phone. Amazon has yet to release official sales figures for the device.

According to Chitika Insights, an advertising company, by analyzing ad impressions from July 25 to August 14, 2014 (20 days after the release of the device), the Fire Phone constituted approximately 0.02% of the smartphone market in the United States and Canada. The device's usage share "remained steady but relatively flat". The Guardian later extrapolated based on data from ComScore and Chitika, claiming that no more than 35,000 Fire Phones were sold in the first 20 days. In September 2014, The New York Times reported that sales had been "dismal", and that "analysts say Amazon has sold only a few tens of thousands" of Fire Phones.

In October 2014, during the announcement of 3rd quarter financial results, Amazon stated they took a $170 million hit due to costs associated with the Fire Phone and had over $83 million worth of Fire Phones in inventory, but declined to comment on how this would affect predictions for the 4th quarter. The company's CFO Tom Szkutak indicated its pricing strategy being initially too high was the reason for the product's poor consumer reception.

== Models ==
Generation (within Fire phones)		1st generation (2014)
Model		Fire Phone
Release date		25 July 2014
Status		Discontinued
OS		Fire OS 3.5, later updated to Fire OS 4
System Version		4.6.6.1
Screen	Size (diagonal)	4.7 in (12 cm)
Screen	Resolution	1280 × 720
Screen	Density	312 ppi
CPU	Maker	Qualcomm
CPU	Kind	Quad-core Snapdragon
CPU	Model	800
CPU	Cores	4x Krait 400 @ 2.2 GHz
CPU	Width	32-bit
GPU	Designer	Qualcomm
GPU	Kind	Adreno
GPU	Model	330
GPU	Clock	450 MHz
RAM		2 GiB
Storage	Internal	32 GB or 64 GB
Storage	External	—N/a
Cameras	Back	13 MP
Cameras	Front	4x, 2.1 MP total
Microphones		3
Bluetooth		Bluetooth 4.0 (LE as well) + EDR
Wireless	Wi-Fi	Dual-band 802.11 a/b/g/n/ac
Wireless	Cellular	4G LTE
Location		GPS, aGPS, GLONASS, and Wi-Fi based
Proximity		Yes
Compass		Yes
Light sensor		Yes
Accelerometer		Yes
Gyroscope		Yes
Barometer		Yes
Weight		160 g (5.64 oz)
Dimensions		139.2 mm × 66.5 mm × 8.9 mm (5.48 in × 2.62 in × 0.35 in)
Battery		2400 mAh

== See also ==
- List of 3D-enabled mobile phones
- Microsoft Kin
- HTC First
