= Amazon Coins =

Digital payment method by Amazon

Amazon Coins were a digital payment method created by Amazon. They were discontinued in August 2025.

The coins could only be used on the Amazon Appstore for Kindle, Kindle Fire, and Android devices.

== History ==
Amazon introduced Amazon Coins on July 13, 2013, in the United States and gave 500 free coins valued $5/£3 to all users of Kindle Fire devices, who could use the coins to purchase apps, games, and in-app purchases on the Amazon Appstore. In 2014, Amazon started allowing all Android users in Germany, the United Kingdom, and the United States to use Amazon Coins on the Appstore. Users could get discounts when they bought the coins in bulk and earn coins through certain apps on the Appstore.

In 2014, with the release of the Fire Phone, Amazon offered app developers 500,000 Amazon Coins for each paid app or app with in-app purchasing developed and optimized for the Fire Phone.

On February 20, 2025, Amazon announced the discontinuation of the Amazon Coins program through an email sent to Amazon Appstore customers. Per the announcement, coins were no longer available for purchase, and the program was set to be discontinued on August 20, 2025. Unused coins after that date were refunded.

== Function and value ==
Amazon has called Amazon Coins a "virtual currency". However, the Coins operate like other digital gift cards. When a customer bought software with Amazon Coins, the developer was paid in conventional currency.

One Amazon Coin was worth one cent in the US, but values differed by country; for example, on the UK platform, they were worth 1 pence. They could not be redeemed for cash or transferred to another account. The inability to transfer redeemable platform currencies such as Amazon Coins allow for greater revenue generation.

Purchased Coins did not expire, but some promotional Coins expired just over one year from the date they were acquired.
