= Amazon Kindle devices =

E-reader devices

The first Amazon Kindle e-reader device was introduced in November 2007. As of 2026, fourteen generations of Kindle devices have been released, with the latest range being released in October 2026.

== Devices ==
Early Kindles with physical keyboards
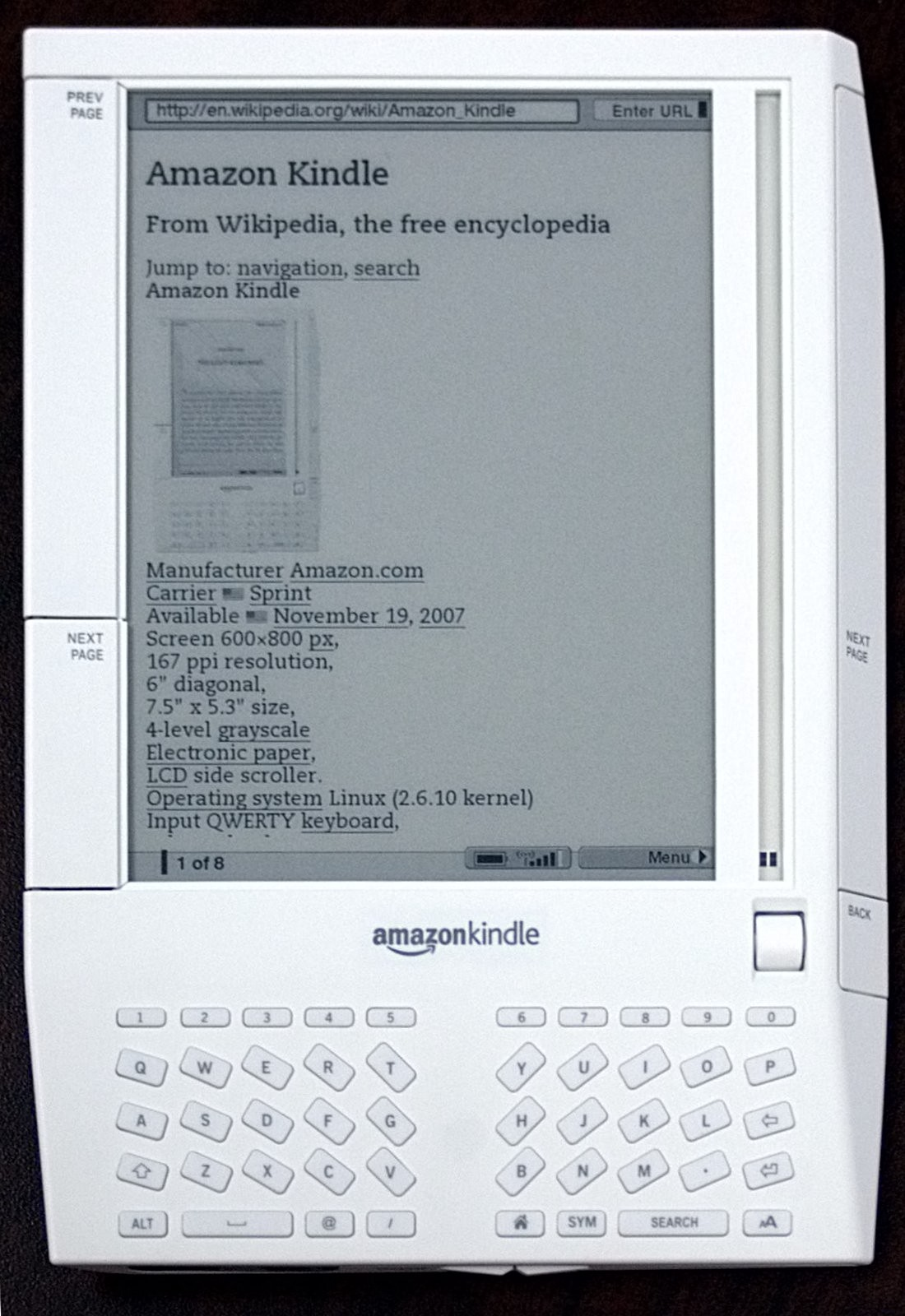
The first Kindle

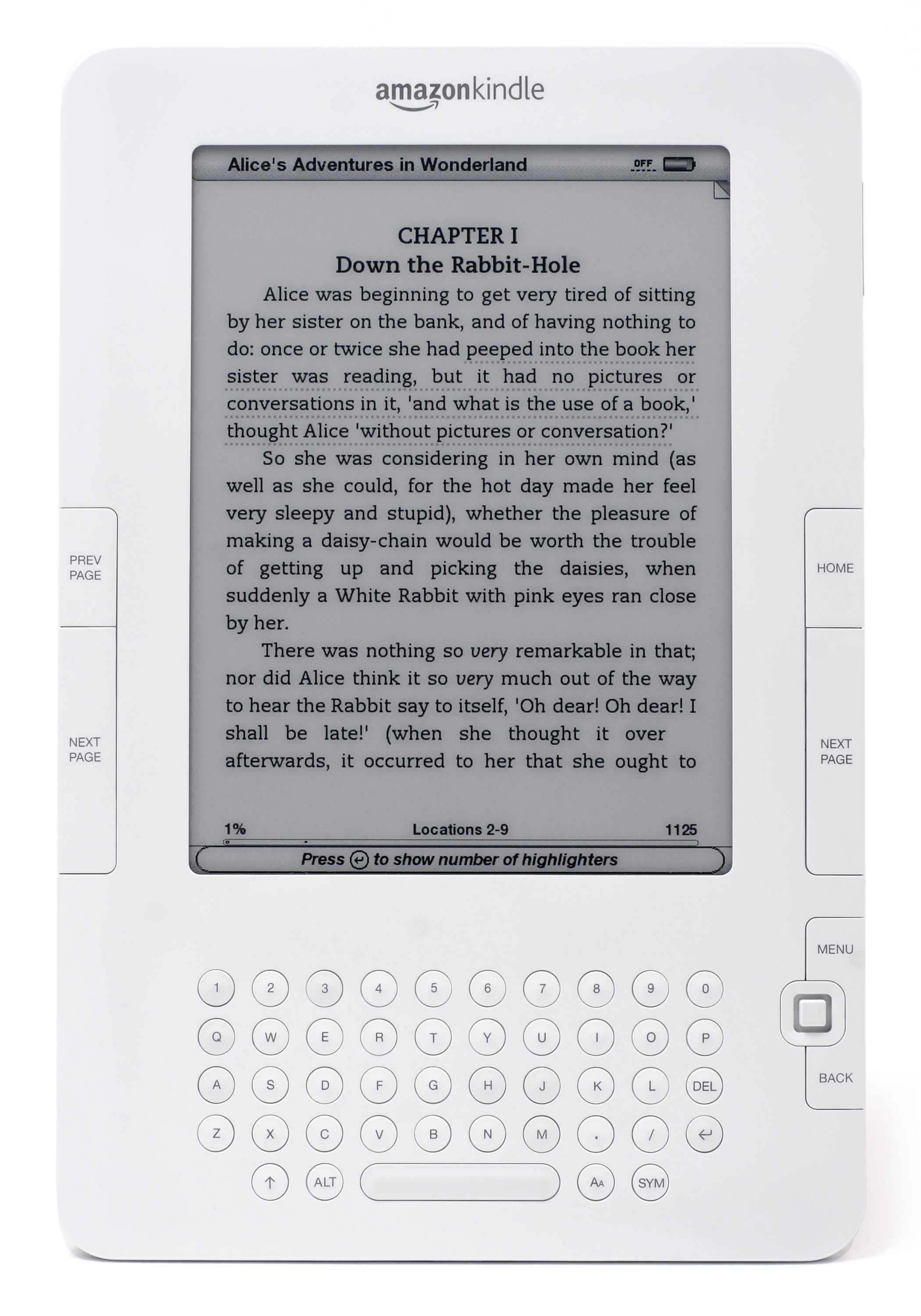
Kindle 2

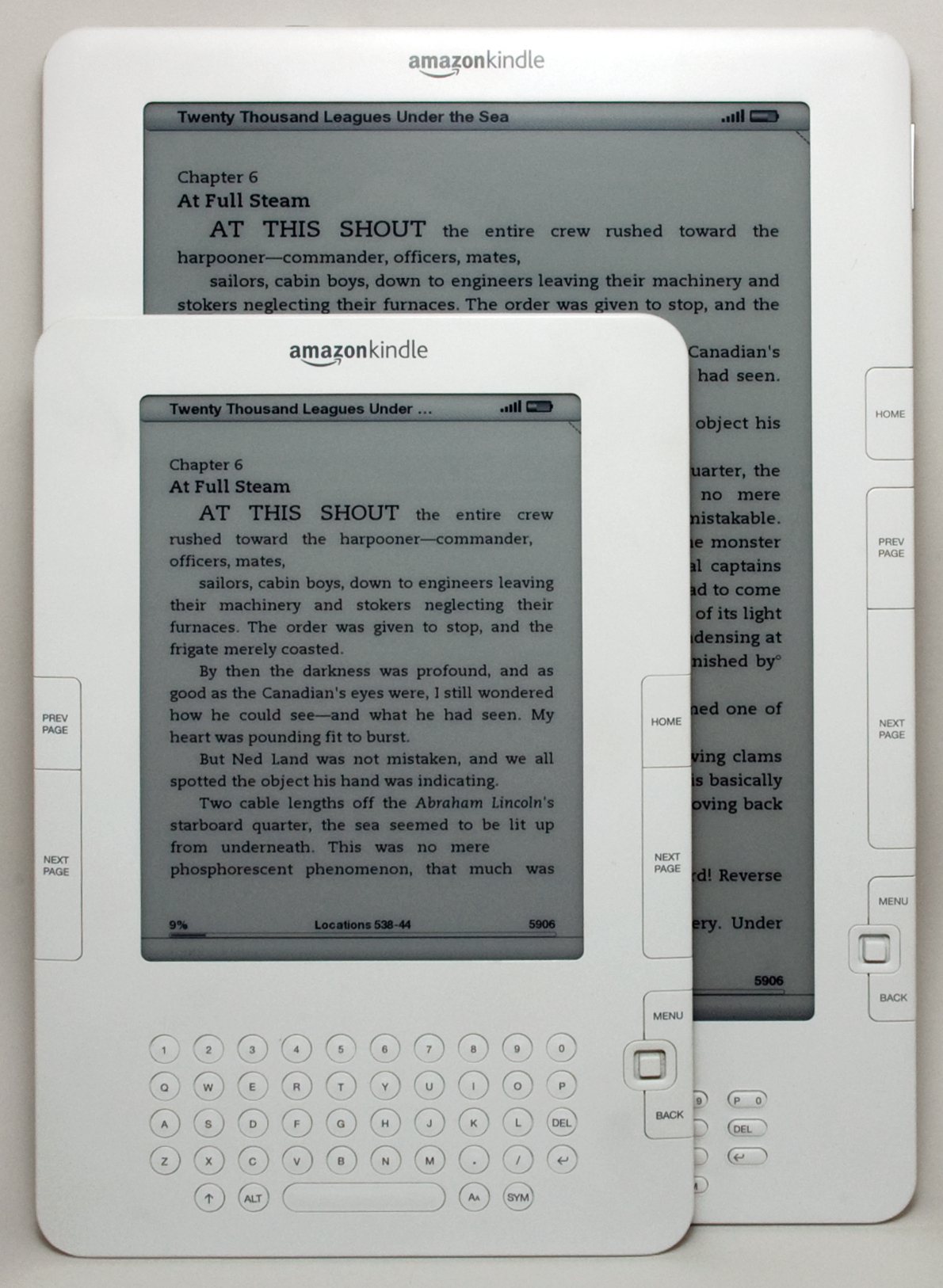
A Kindle DX underneath a Kindle 2

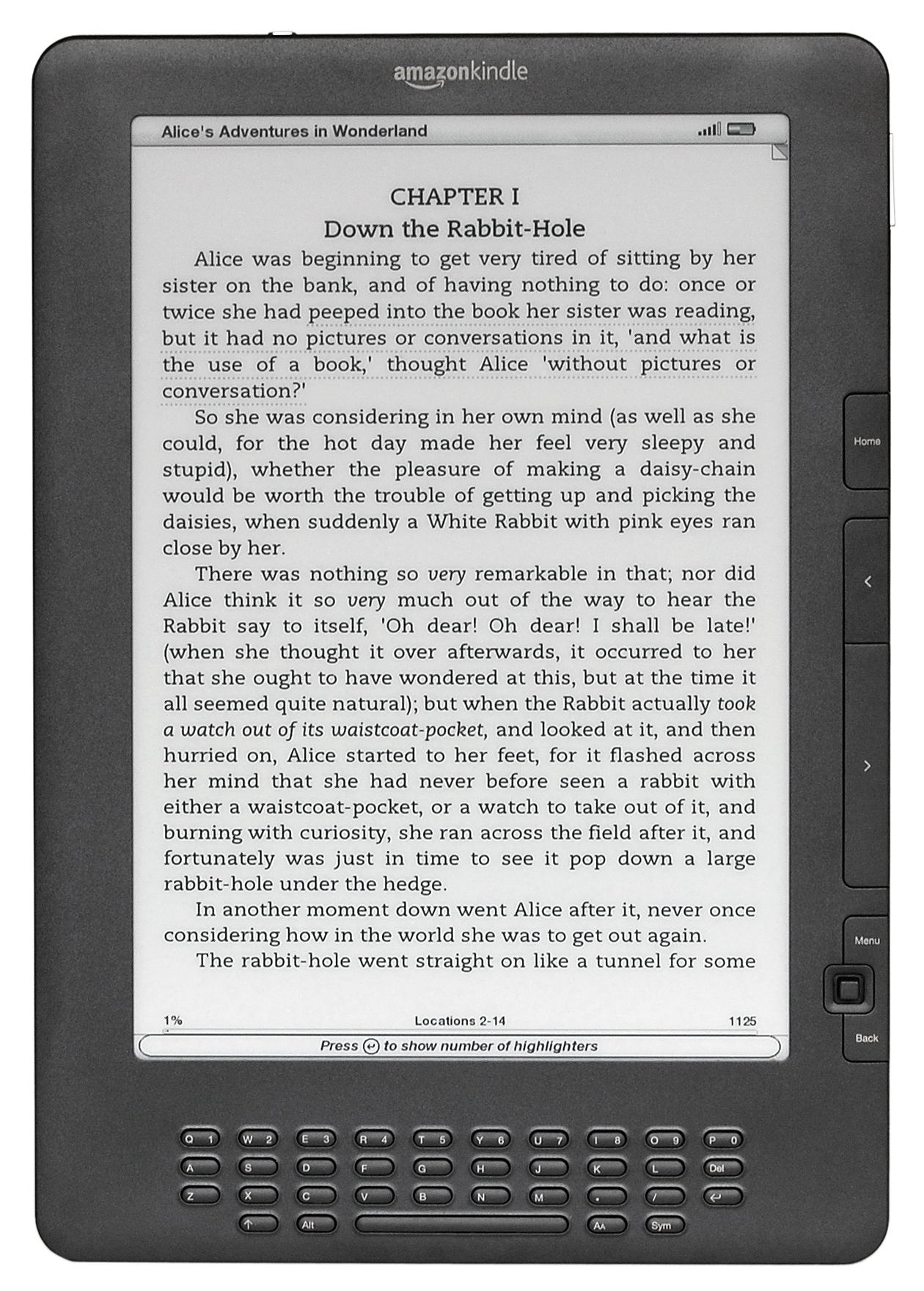
Kindle DX Graphite

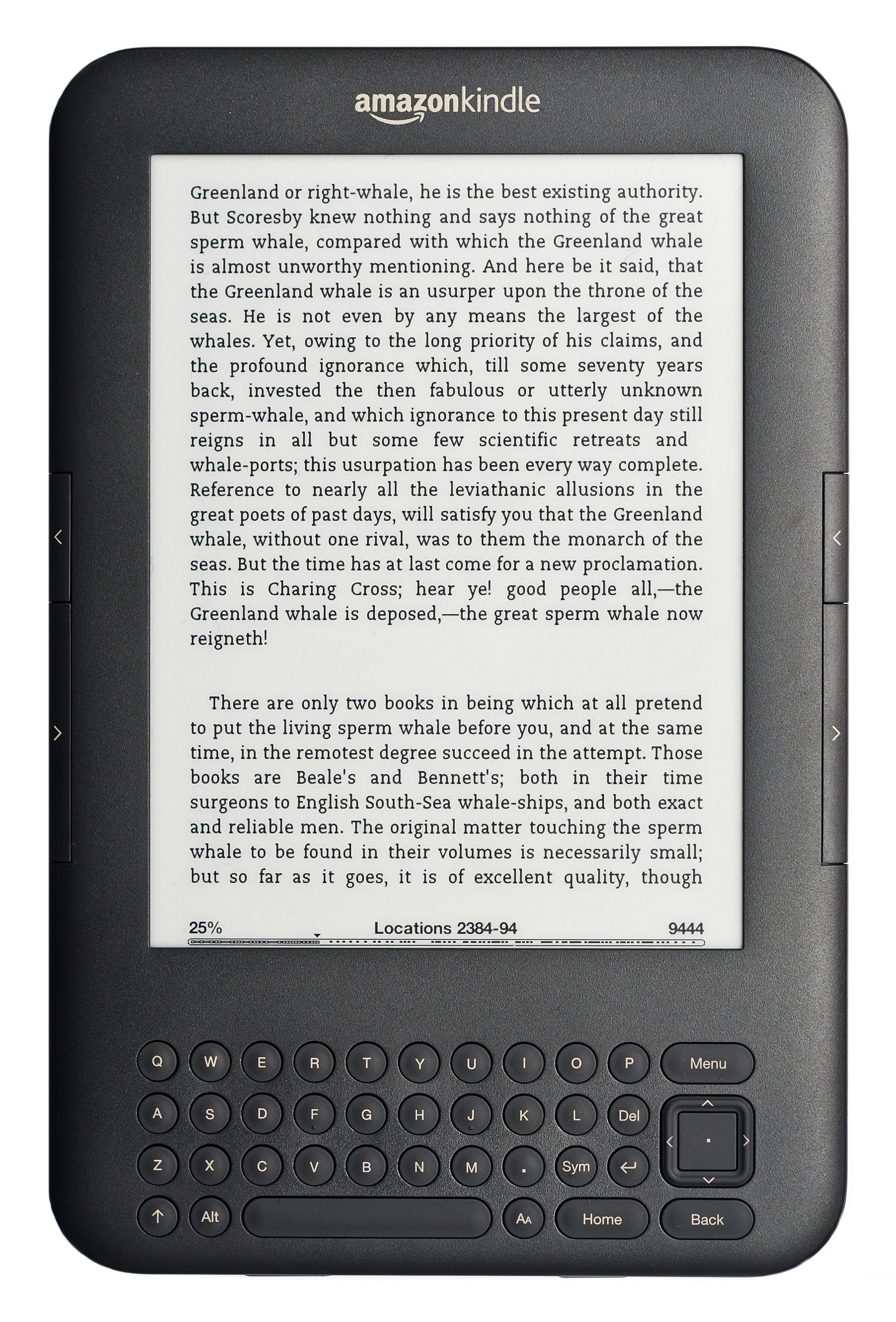
Kindle Keyboard

=== First generation ===
==== Kindle ====
Amazon released the Kindle, its first e-reader, on November 19, 2007, for $399. It sold out in 5.5 hours. The device remained out of stock for five months until late April 2008.

The device featured a six-inch (diagonal) four-level grayscale E Ink display, with 250 MB of internal storage, which can hold approximately 200 non-illustrated titles. It also has a speaker and a headphone jack for listening to audio files. It has expandable storage via an SD card slot. Content was available from Amazon via the Sprint Corporation US-wide EVDO 3G data network, via a dedicated connection protocol which Amazon called Whispernet. Amazon did not sell the first-generation Kindle outside of the US.

=== Second generation ===
==== Kindle 2 ====
On February 10, 2009, Amazon announced the Kindle 2, the second-generation Kindle. It became available for purchase on February 23, 2009. The Kindle 2 features a text-to-speech option to read the text aloud. It also has 6-inch screen and 2 GB of internal memory, of which 1.4 GB is user-accessible. By Amazon's estimates, the Kindle 2 can hold about 1,500 non-illustrated books. Unlike the first-generation Kindle, Kindle 2 does not have a slot for SD memory cards. It is slimmer than the original Kindle. The Kindle 2 features a Freescale 532 MHz, ARM-11 90 nm processor, 32 MB main memory, 2 GB flash memory and a 3.7 V 1,530 mAh lithium polymer battery.

To promote the Kindle 2, in February 2009 author Stephen King released Ur, his new novella, made available exclusively through the Kindle Store.

==== Kindle 2 international ====
On October 7, 2009, Amazon announced an international version of the Kindle 2 with the ability to download e-books wirelessly. This version released in over 100 countries. It became available on October 19, 2009. The international Kindle 2 is physically the same as the U.S.-only Kindle 2, although it uses a different mobile network standard.

The original Kindle 2 used CDMA2000 for use on the Sprint network. The international version used standard GSM and 3G GSM, enabling it to be used on AT&T's U.S. mobile network and internationally in 100 other countries with Amazon offering free unlimited roaming.

==== Kindle DX ====
Amazon launched the Kindle DX on May 6, 2009. At 9.7 inches, this device had the largest Kindle screen until the release of the Scribe. The pixel density of 150 ppi was the lowest of any E-ink Kindle device. It supports displaying PDF files. It was marketed as more suitable for displaying newspaper and textbook content, includes built-in speakers, and has an accelerometer that enables users to rotate pages between landscape and portrait orientations when the Kindle DX is turned on its side. The device can only connect to Whispernet while in the U.S.

==== Kindle DX international ====
On January 19, 2010, the Kindle DX international version was released in over 100 countries. The Kindle DX international version is the same as the Kindle DX, except for having support for international 3G data.

==== Kindle DX Graphite ====
On July 1, 2010, Amazon released the Kindle DX Graphite (DXG) globally. The DXG has an E Ink display with 50% better contrast ratio due to using E Ink Pearl technology and comes only in a graphite case color. It is speculated the case color change is to improve contrast ratio perception further, as some users found the prior white casing highlighted that the E Ink background is light gray and not white. Like the Kindle DX, it does not have a Wi-Fi connection. The DXG is a mix of third-generation hardware and second-generation software. The CPU has the same speed as Kindle Keyboard's CPU, but the DXG has only half the system memory, 128 MB. Due to these differences, the DXG runs the same firmware as Kindle 2. Therefore, DXG cannot display international fonts, like Cyrillic, Chinese, or any other non-Latin font, and PDF support and the web browser are limited to matching the Kindle 2's features.

Amazon withdrew the Kindle DX from sale in October 2012, but in September 2013 made it available again for a few months. Using 3G data is free when accessing the Kindle Store and Wikipedia. Downloading personal documents via 3G data costs about $1 per megabyte. Its battery life is about one week with 3G on and two weeks with 3G off. Text-to-Speech and MP3 playback are supported.

=== Third generation ===
==== Kindle Keyboard ====
Amazon announced the third-generation Kindle, later renamed "Kindle Keyboard", on July 28, 2010. Amazon began accepting pre-orders for the Kindle Keyboard as soon as it was announced and began shipping the devices on August 27, 2010. On August 25, Amazon announced that the Kindle Keyboard was the fastest-selling Kindle ever. While Amazon does not officially add numbers to the end of each Kindle denoting its generation, reviewers, customers and press companies often referred to this Kindle as the "K3" or the "Kindle 3". The Kindle Keyboard has a 6-inch screen with a resolution of 600×800 (167 PPI).

The Kindle Keyboard was available in two versions. One of these, the Kindle Wi-Fi, was initially priced at $139 and connects to the Internet via Wi-Fi networks. The other version, called the Kindle 3G, was priced at $189 and includes both 3G and Wi-Fi connectivity. The built-in free 3G connectivity uses the same wireless signals that cell phones use, allowing it to download and purchase content from any location with cell service. The Kindle Keyboard is available in two colors: classic white and graphite. Both versions use an E Ink "Pearl" display, which has a higher contrast than prior displays and a faster refresh rate than prior e-ink displays. However, it remains significantly slower than traditional LCDs. An ad-supported version, the "Kindle with Special Offers", was introduced on May 3, 2011, with a price $25 lower than the no-ad version, for $114. On July 13, 2011, Amazon announced that due to a sponsorship with AT&T, the price of the Kindle 3G with ads would be $139, $50 less than the Kindle 3G without ads.

The Kindle Keyboard is 0.5 inches shorter and 0.5 inches narrower than the Kindle 2. It supports additional fonts and international Unicode characters and has a Voice Guide feature with spoken menu navigation from the built-in speakers or audio jack. Internal memory is expanded to 4 GB, with approximately 3 GB available for user content. Battery life is advertised at up to two months of reading half an hour a day with the wireless turned off, which amounts to roughly 30 hours.

The Kindle Keyboard generally received good reviews after launch. Review Horizon describes the device as offering "the best reading experience in its class" while Engadget states, "In the standalone category, the Kindle is probably the one to beat".

=== Fourth generation ===
The fourth-generation Kindle and the Kindle Touch were announced on September 28, 2011. They retain the 6-inch, 167-PPI e-ink display of the 2010 Kindle model, with the addition of an infrared touch-screen control on the Touch. They also include Amazon's experimental web-browsing capability with Wi-Fi. On the same date, Amazon announced the Kindle Fire, a tablet computer including a Kindle app; in September 2014, Kindle was dropped from the Amazon Fire's name.

==== Kindle 4 ====
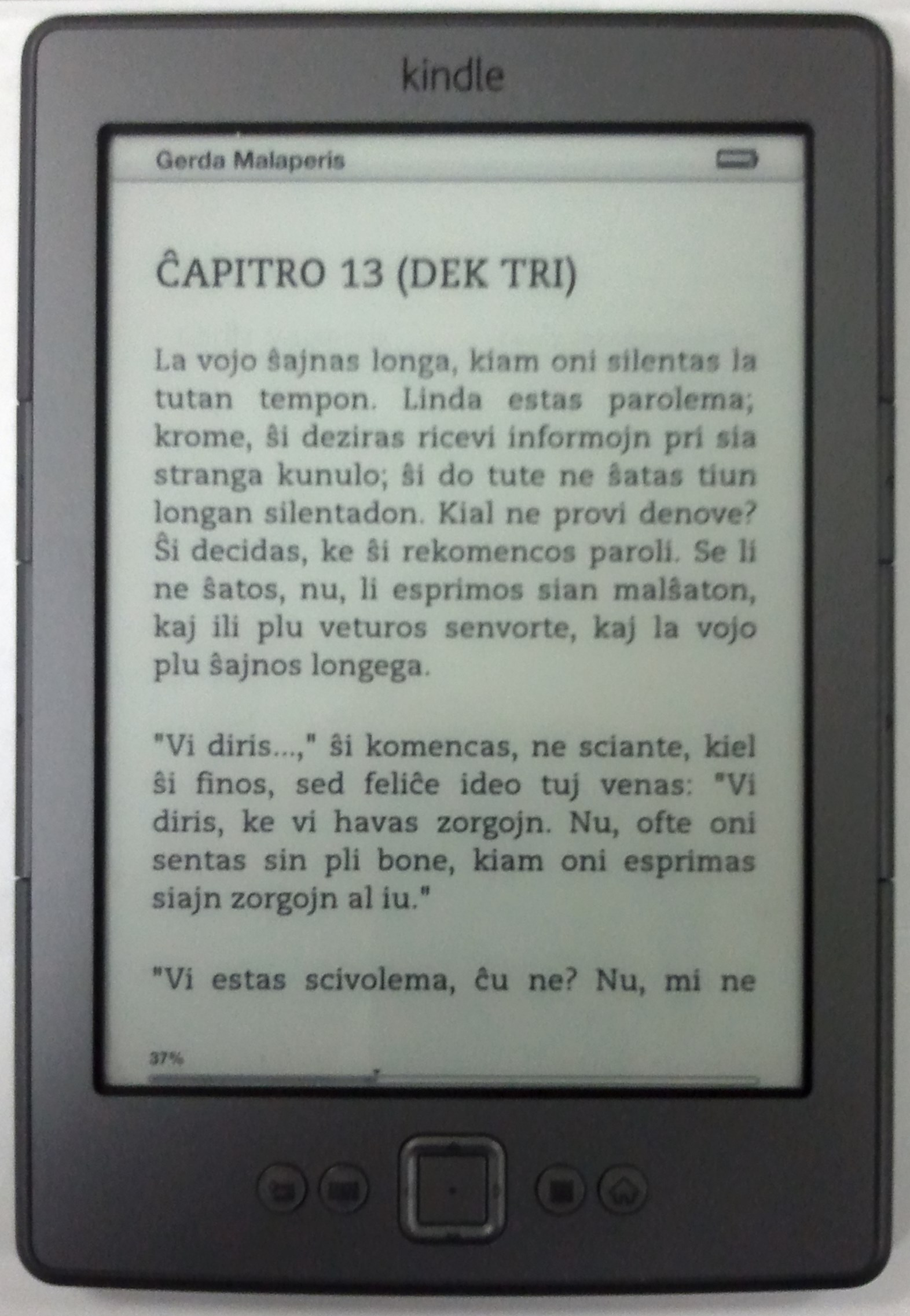
Kindle 4

The fourth-generation Kindle was significantly less expensive (initially $79 ad supported, $109 no ads) and features a slight reduction in weight and size, with a reduced battery life and storage capacity, compared to the Kindle 3. It has a silver-grey bezel, 6-inch display, nine hard keys, a cursor pad, an on-screen rather than physical keyboard, a flash storage capacity of 2 GB, and an estimated one month battery life under ideal reading conditions.

==== Kindle Touch ====
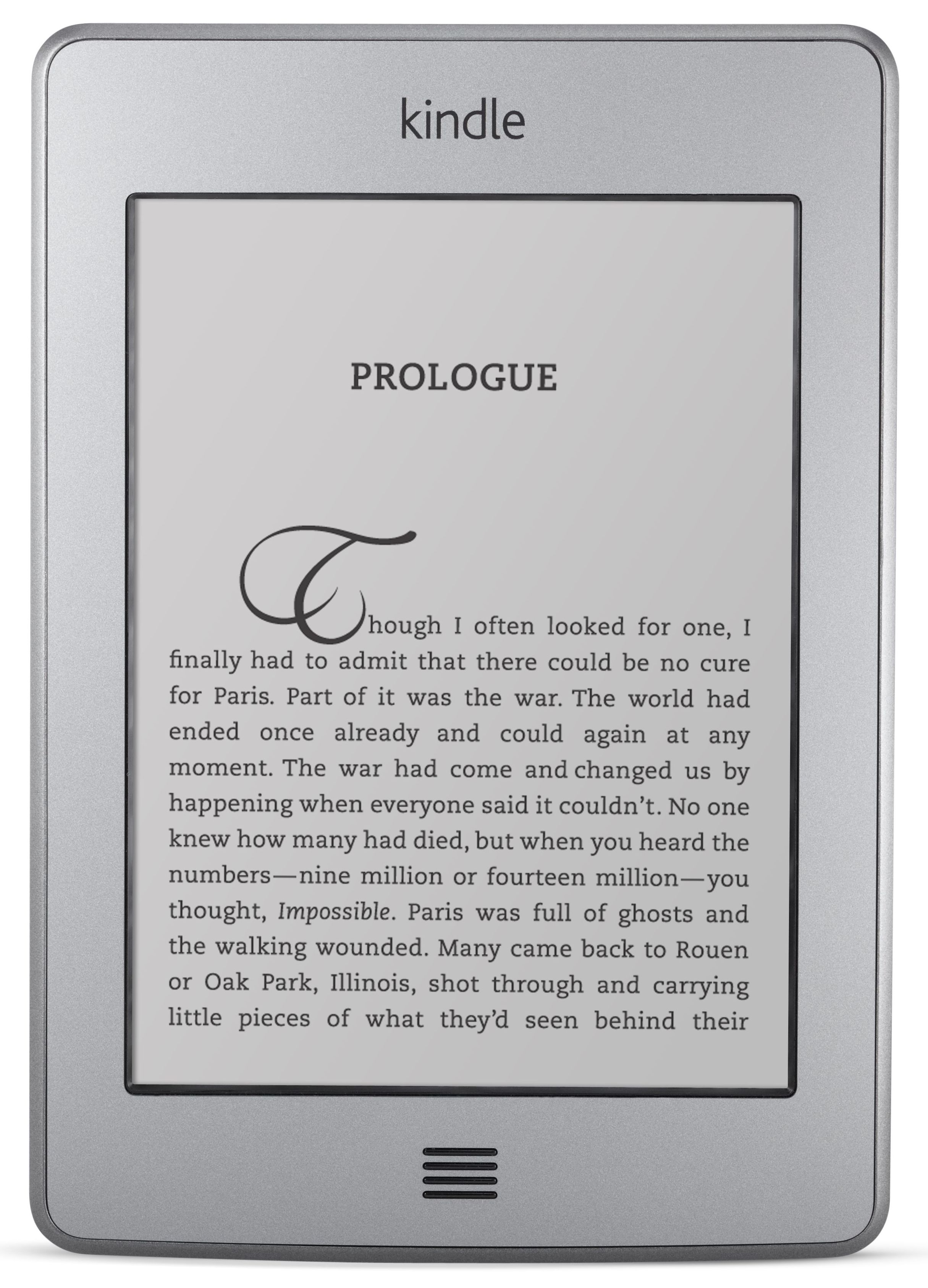
Kindle Touch

Amazon introduced two versions of touchscreen Kindles: the Kindle Touch, available with Wi-Fi (initially $99 ad-supported, $139 no ads), and the Kindle Touch 3G, with Wi-Fi/3G connectivity (initially $149 ad-supported, $189 no ads). The latter version is capable of connecting via 3G to the Kindle Store, downloading books and periodicals, and accessing Wikipedia. Experimental web browsing (outside Wikipedia) on Kindle Touch 3G is only available over a Wi-Fi connection. (Kindle Keyboard does not have this restriction). The usage of the 3G data is limited to 50MB per month. Like the Kindle 3, the Kindle Touch has a capacity of 4 GB and battery life of two months under ideal reading conditions, and is larger than the Kindle 4. The Kindle Touch was released on November 15, 2011. Amazon announced in March 2012 that the device would be available in the UK, Germany, France, Spain and Italy on April 27, 2012. The Touch was the first Kindle to support X-Ray, which lists the commonly used character names, locations, themes, or ideas in a book. In January 2013, Amazon released the 5.2.0 firmware that updated the operating system to match the Paperwhite's interface with the Touch's MP3/audiobook capabilities remaining.

=== Fifth generation ===
==== Kindle 5 ====
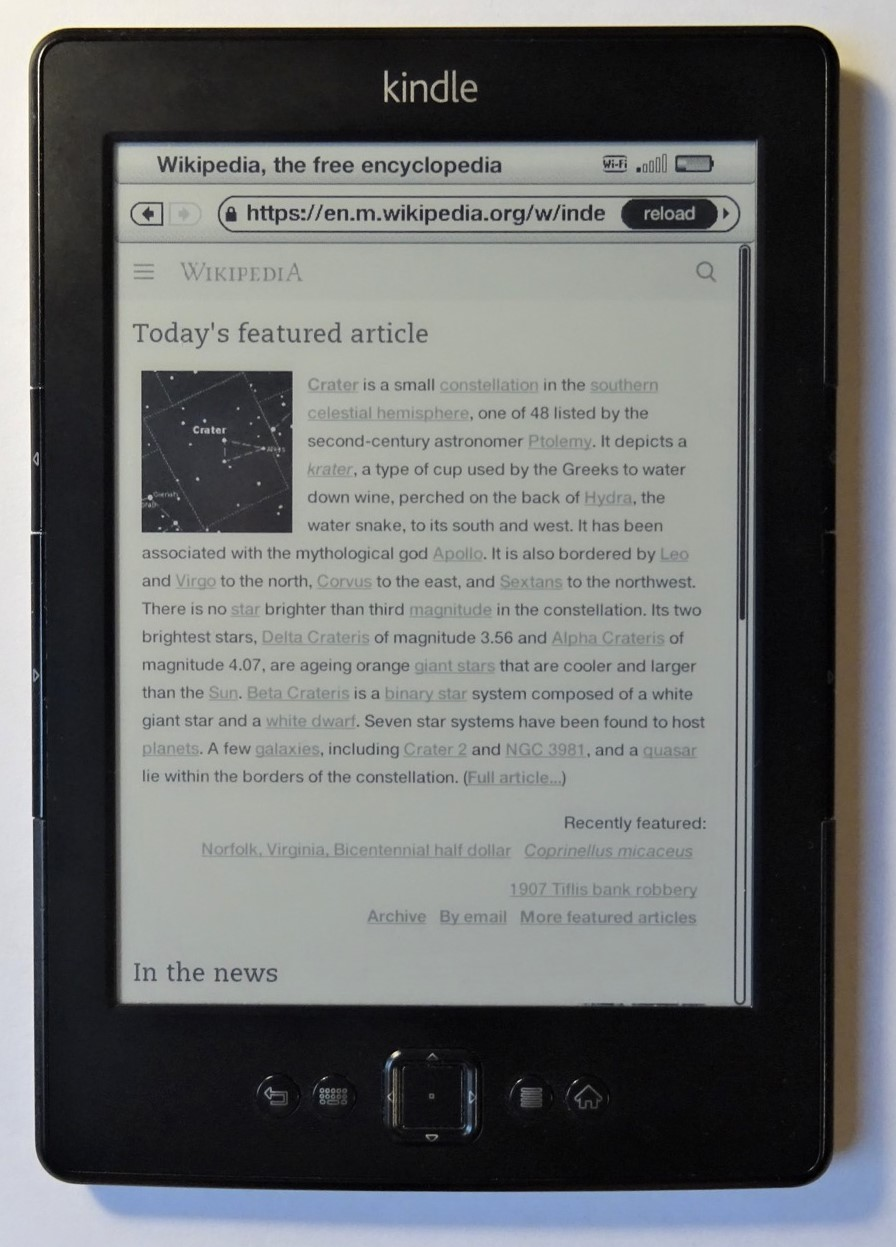
Kindle 5

Amazon released the Kindle 5 on September 6, 2012 ($70 ad-supported, $90 no ads). The Kindle has a black bezel, differing from the Kindle 4 which was available in silver-grey, and has better display contrast. Amazon also claims that it has 15% faster page loads. It has a 167 PPI display and was the lightest Kindle, at 5.98 ounce, until 2016's Kindle Oasis.

==== Kindle Paperwhite (first iteration) ====
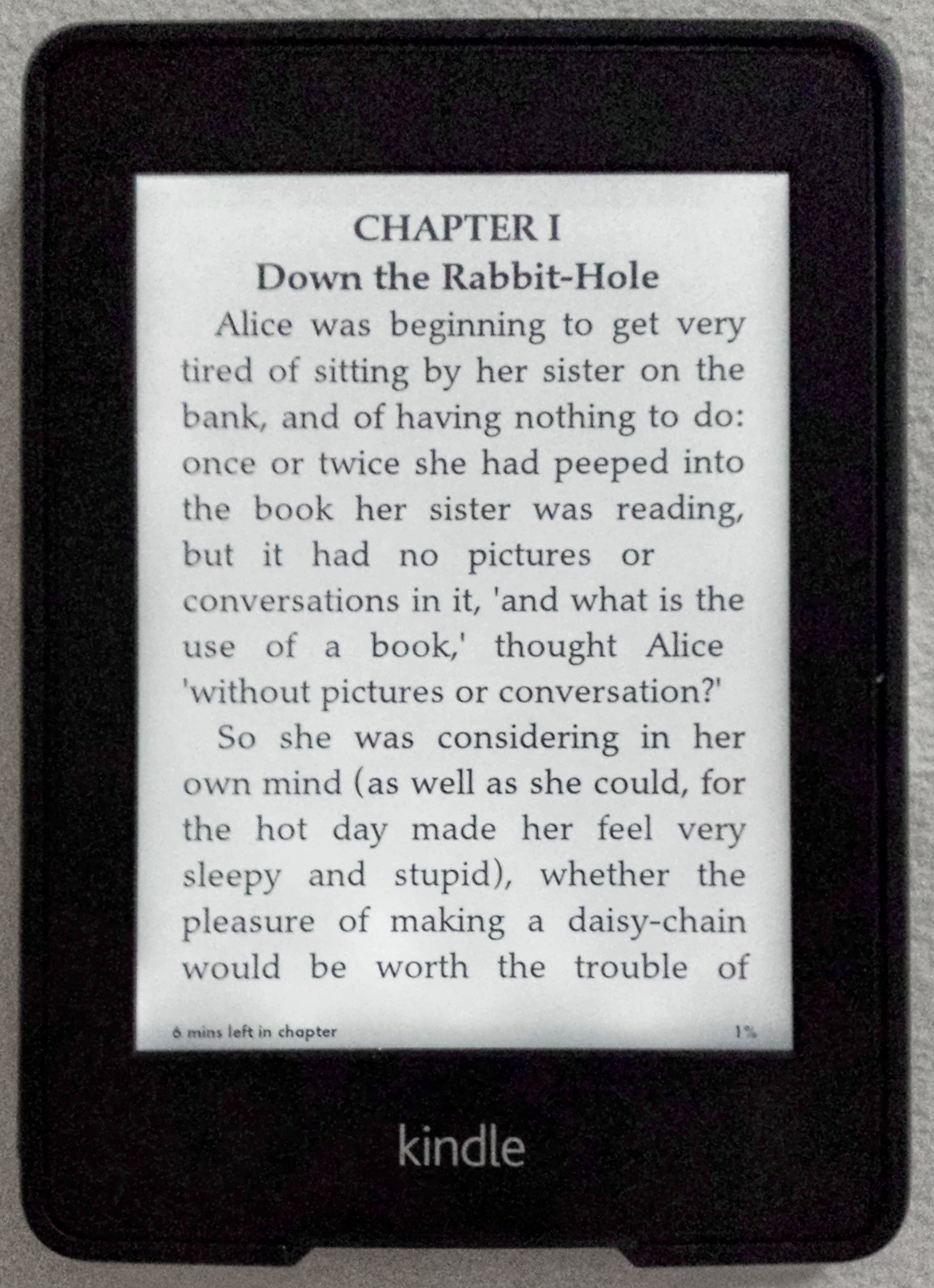
Kindle Paperwhite

The first-iteration Kindle Paperwhite was announced on September 6, 2012, and released on October 1. It has a 6 in, 212 PPI E Ink Pearl display (758×1024 resolution) with four built-in LEDs to illuminate the screen. It was available in Wi-Fi ($120 ad-supported, $140 no ads) and Wi-Fi + 3G ($180 ad-supported, $200 no ads) models, with the ad-supported options only intended to be available in the United States. The light is one of the main features of the Paperwhite and it has a manually adjusted light level. The 3G access restrictions are the same as the Kindle Touch, and usage of the 3G data is limited to 50 MB per month and only on Amazon and Wikipedia's websites; additional data may be bought. Battery life is advertised as up to eight weeks of reading with half an hour per day with wireless off and constant light use; this usage equals 28 hours. The official leather cover for the Paperwhite uses a Hall-effect sensor to detect when the cover is closed or opened and turn the screen off or on respectively. This was the first Kindle model to track reading speed to estimate when the reader will finish a chapter or book; this feature was later included with updates to the other models of Kindle and Kindle Fire. The Kindle Paperwhite lacks physical buttons for page turning and does not perform auto-hyphenation. Except for the lock screen/power button at its bottom, it relies solely on the touchscreen interface.

In November 2012, Amazon released the 5.3.0 update that allowed users to turn off recommended content on the home screen in Grid View (allowing two rows of user content) and included general bug fixes. In March 2014, the Paperwhite 5.4.4 update was released that added Goodreads integration, Kindle FreeTime to restrict usage for children, Cloud Collections for organization and Page Flip for scanning content without losing your place, which closely matched the Paperwhite 2's software features.

The Kindle Paperwhite was released in most major international markets in early 2013, with Japan's version including 4 GB of storage, and in China on June 7, 2013; all non-Japan versions have 2 GB of storage (1.25 GB usable).

Engadget praised the Paperwhite, giving it 92 of 100. The reviewer liked the frontlit display, high contrast, and useful software features, but did not like that it was less comfortable to hold than the Nook, the starting price includes ads, and it had no expandable storage.

Shortly after release, some users complained about the lighting implementation on the Kindle Paperwhite. While not widespread, some users found the lighting inconsistent, causing the bottom edge to cast irregular shadows. Also, some users complained that the light cannot be turned off completely.

=== Sixth generation ===
==== Kindle Paperwhite (second iteration) ====
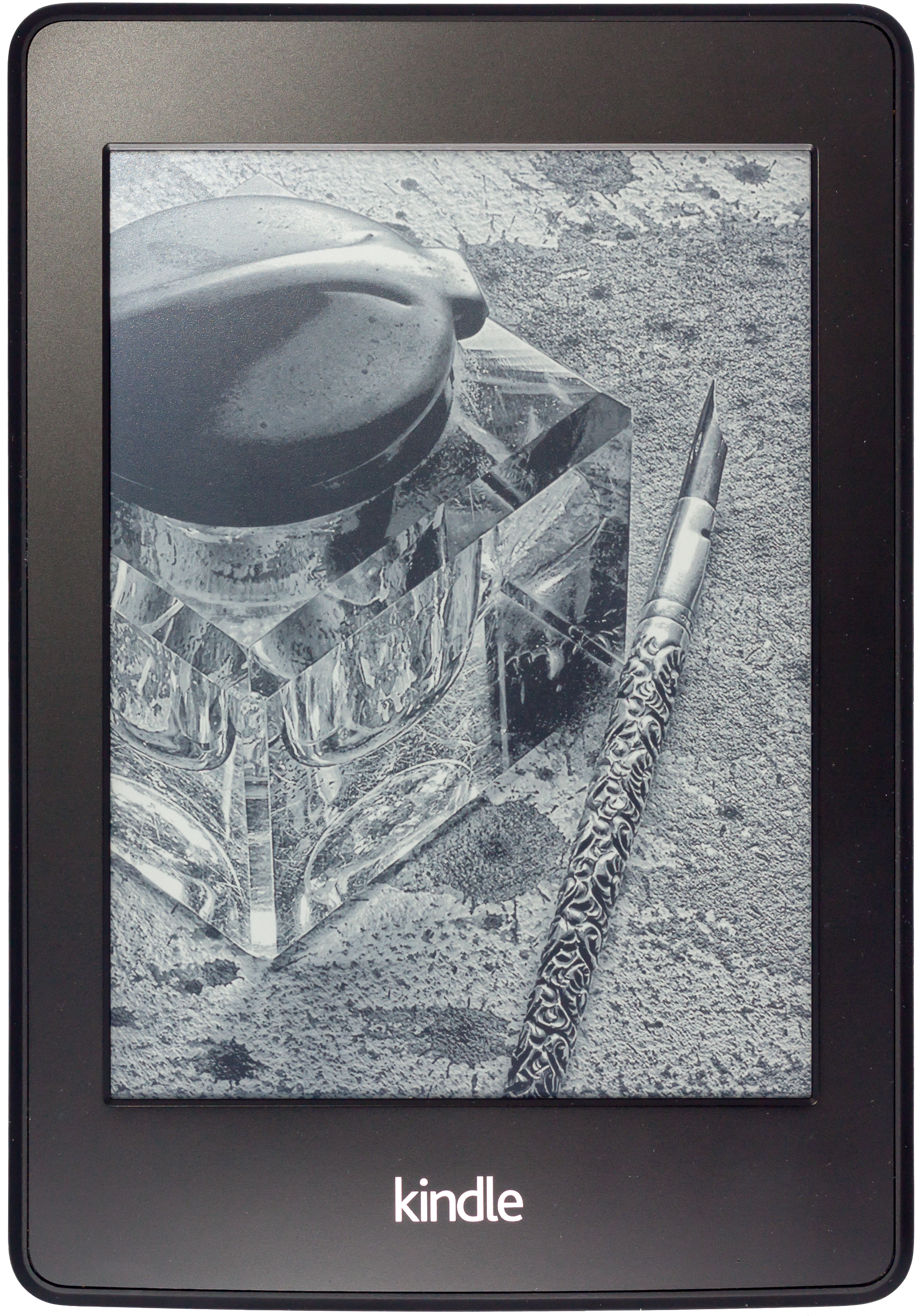
Kindle Paperwhite 2

Amazon announced the second-iteration Kindle Paperwhite, marketed as the "All-New Kindle Paperwhite" and colloquially referred to as the Paperwhite 2, on September 3, 2013; the Wi-Fi version was released on September 30 ($120 ad-supported, $140 no ads), and the 3G/Wi-Fi version was released in the US on November 5, 2013 ($190 ad-supported, $210 no ads). The Paperwhite 2 features a higher contrast E Ink Carta display technology, improved LED illumination, 25% faster processor (1 GHz) that allows for faster page turns, and better response to touch input compared to the original Paperwhite. It has the same 6" screen with 212 PPI, bezel and estimated 28-hour battery life as the original Paperwhite. The software features dictionary/Wikipedia/X-Ray look-up, Page Flip that allows the user to skip ahead or back in the text in a pop-up window and go back to the previous page, and Goodreads social integration.

The Paperwhite 2 uses a similar experimental web browser with the same 3G data use restrictions as previous Kindles; there are no use restrictions when using Wi-Fi. The official Amazon leather cover for the Paperwhite 2 is the same item as was used for the original Paperwhite. The cover's magnets turn the screen on and off when it is opened and closed.

Although released in 2013 with 2 GB of storage, all versions of the Paperwhite 2 were sold with 4GB of storage by September 2014.

Engadget rated the Paperwhite 2 as 93 of 100, saying while it offers few new features, "an improved frontlight and some software tweaks have made an already great reading experience even better."

=== Seventh generation ===
==== Kindle 7 ====
Amazon announced an upgraded basic Kindle and the Kindle Voyage on September 18, 2014. The Kindle 7 was released on October 2, 2014 ($80 ad-supported, $100 no ads). It is the first basic Kindle to use a touchscreen for navigating within books and to have a 1 GHz CPU. It is also the first basic Kindle available in international markets such as India, Japan and China. Amazon claims that a single charge lasts up to 30 days if used for 30 minutes a day without using Wi-Fi.

==== Kindle Voyage ====
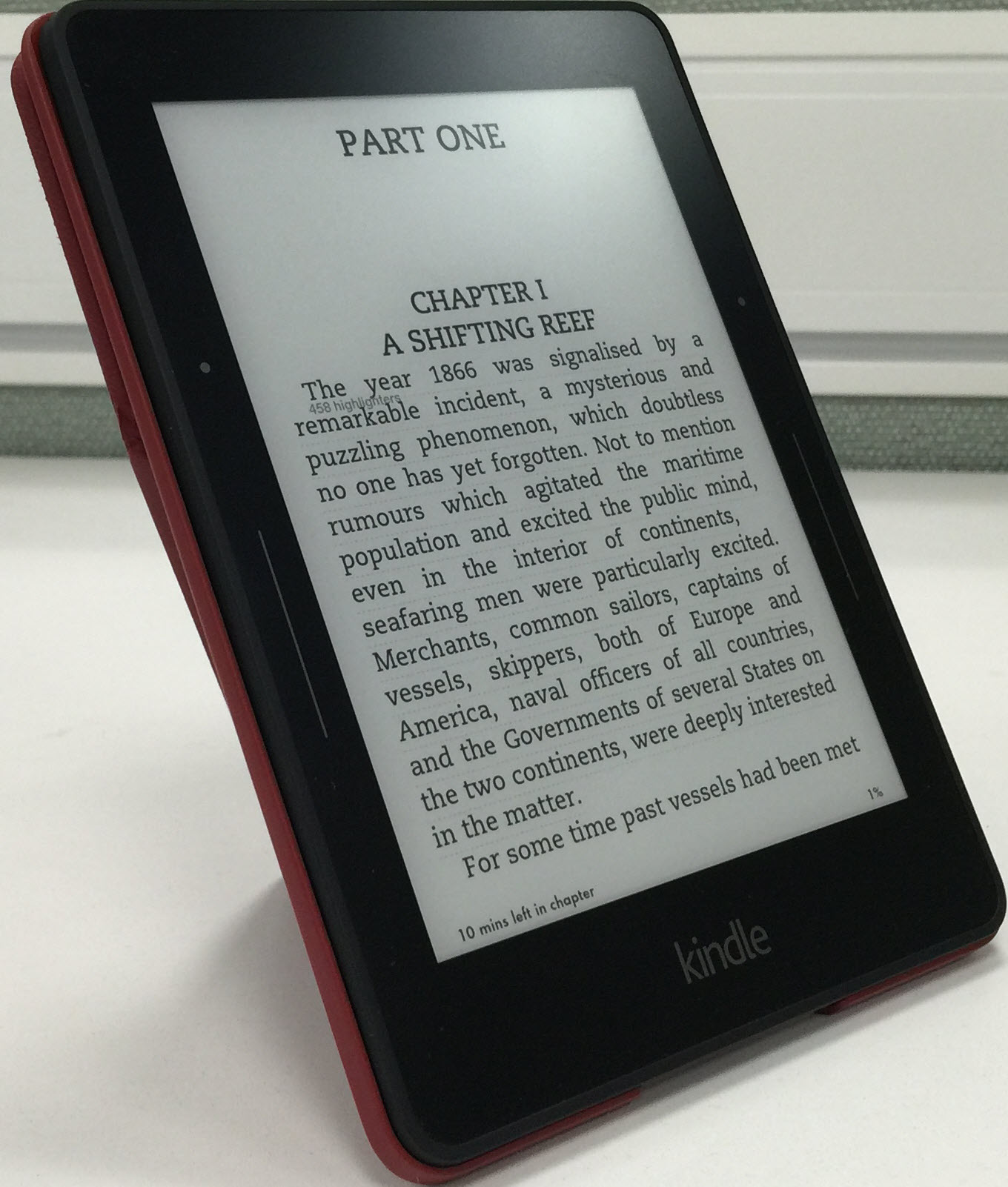
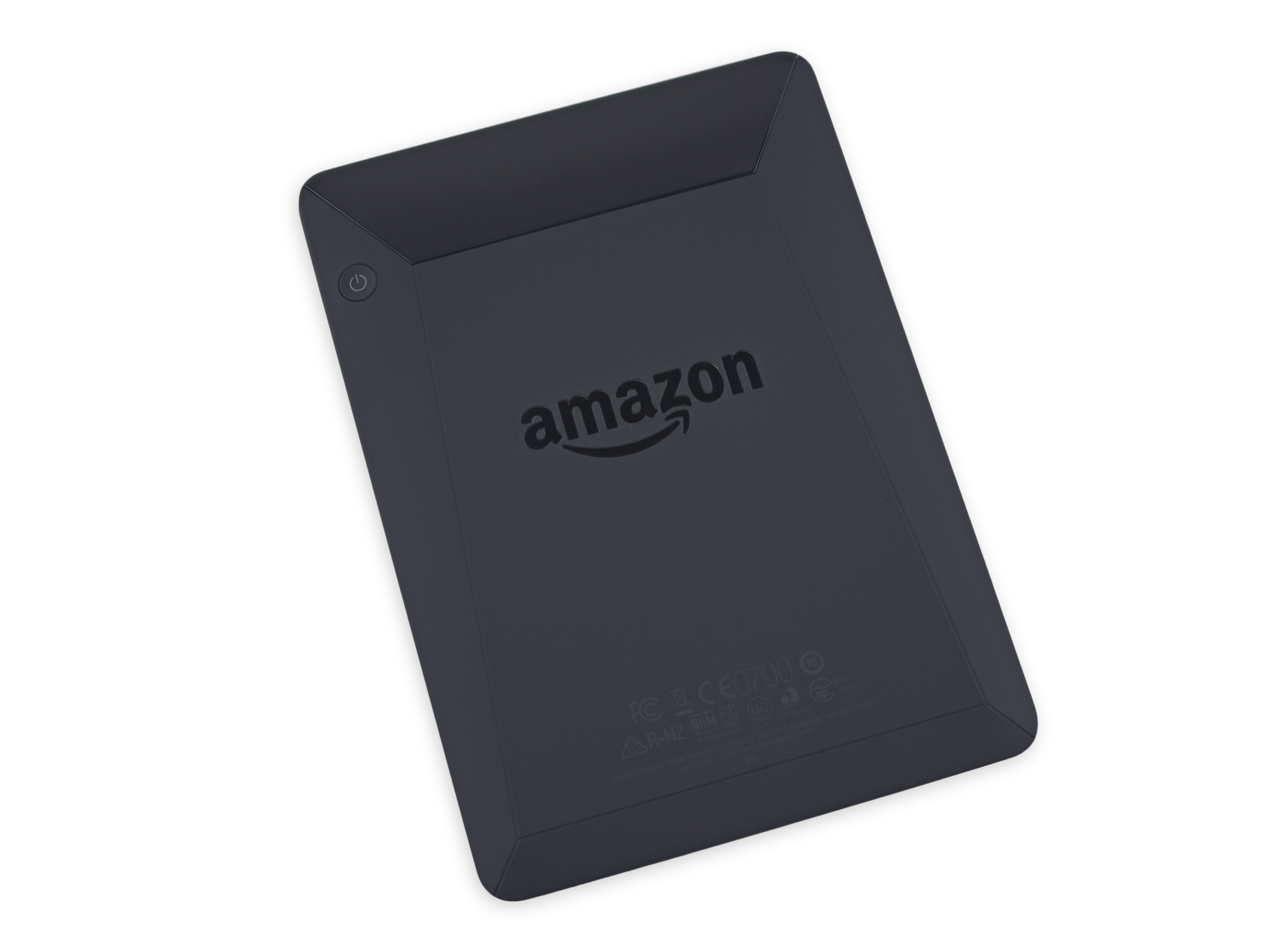
Kindle Voyage

The Kindle Voyage was released on November 4, 2014, in the U.S. It has a 6-inch, 300 ppi E Ink Carta HD display, which was the highest resolution and contrast available in e-readers, as of 2014, with six LEDs with an adaptive light sensor that can automatically illuminate the screen depending on the environment. It is available in Wi-Fi ($200 ad-supported, $220 no ads) and Wi-Fi + 3G ($270 ad-supported, $290 no ads) models. It has 4 GB of storage. Its design features a flush glass screen on the front and the rear has angular, raised plastic edges that house the power button, similar to the Fire HDX. At 0.3 inches, it is the thinnest Kindle to date. The Voyage uses "PagePress", a navigation system that has sensors on either side of the screen that turns the page when pressed. PagePress may be disabled, but the touchscreen is always active.

The Verge rated the Voyage as 9.1 of 10, stating that "this is the best E Ink e-reader I've used, and it's unquestionably the best that Amazon has ever made. The thing is, it's only marginally better than the fantastic Paperwhite in several ways, and significantly better in none" and with those differences in mind, disliked how it costs $80 more than the Paperwhite. Engadget rated the Voyage as 94 of 100, stating that while it was "easily the best e-reader that Amazon has ever crafted," it was also the priciest at $199.

==== Kindle Paperwhite (third iteration) ====
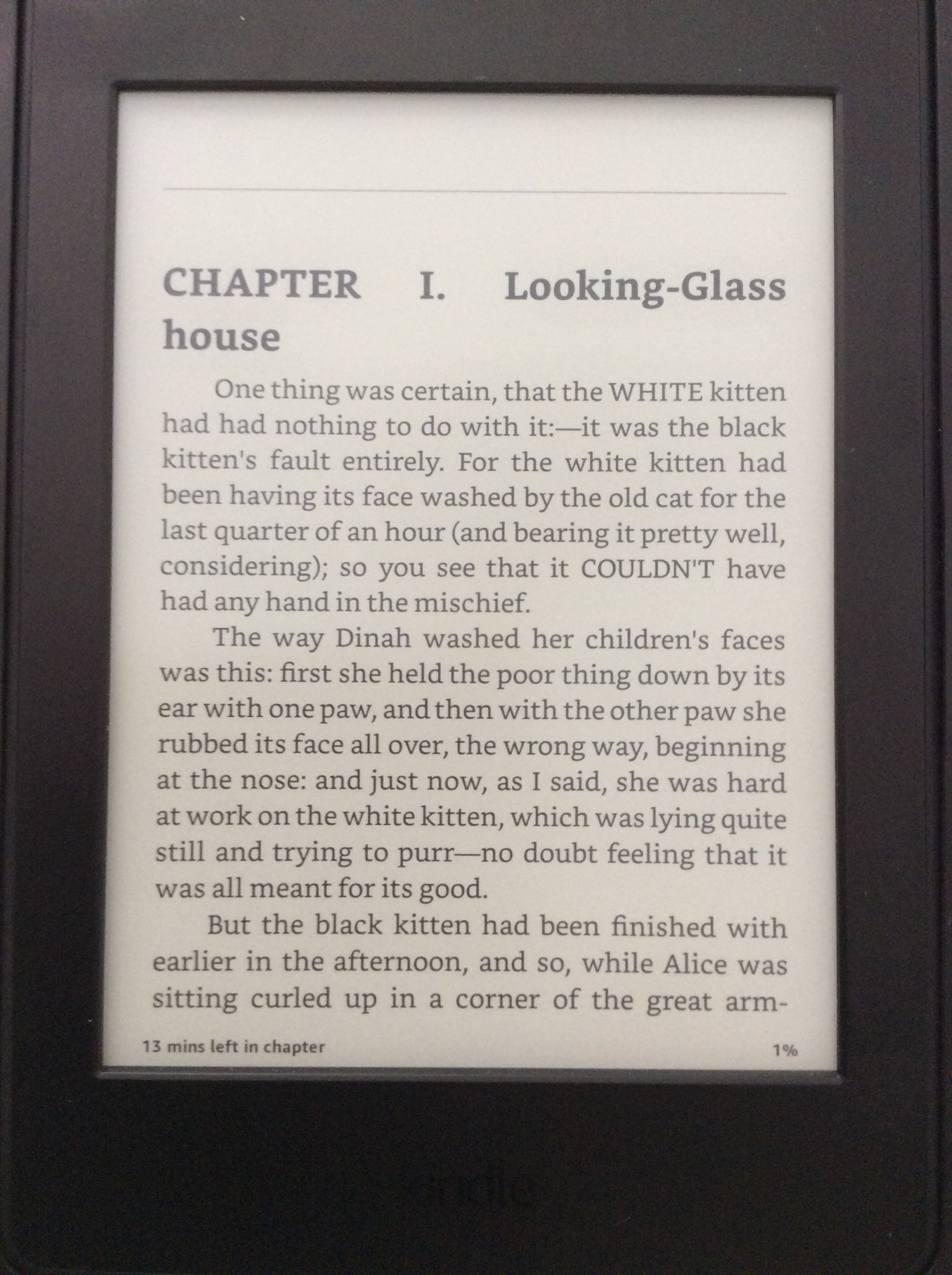
Kindle Paperwhite 3

The third-iteration Kindle Paperwhite, marketed as the "All-New Kindle Paperwhite" and colloquially referred to as the Paperwhite 3 and Paperwhite 2015, was released on June 30, 2015, in the US. It is available in Wi-Fi ($120 ad-supported, $140 no ads) and Wi-Fi + 3G ($190 ad-supported, $210 no ads) models. It has a 6-inch, 1448×1072, 300 ppi E Ink Carta HD display, which is twice the pixels of the original Paperwhite and has the same touchscreen, four LEDs and size as the previous Paperwhite. It has over 3 GB of user accessible storage. This device improved on the display of PDF files, with the possibility to select text and use some functionalities, such as translation on a PDF's text. Amazon claims the device has 6 weeks of battery life if used for 30 minutes per day with wireless off and brightness set to 10, implying a total battery life of about 21 hours.

The Paperwhite 3 is the first e-reader to include the Bookerly font, a new font designed by Amazon, and includes updated formatting functions such as hyphenation and improved spacing. The Bookerly font was added to most older models via a firmware update. The official Amazon leather cover for the Paperwhite 3 is the same item as was used with the previous two Paperwhite devices.

In February 2016, the Paperwhite 2, Paperwhite 3, Kindle 7, and Voyage received the 5.7.2 update that included a new home screen layout, an OpenDyslexic font choice, improved book recommendations, and a new quick actions menu.

On June 30, 2016, Amazon released a white version of the Paperwhite 3 worldwide; the only thing different about this version is the color of the shell.

In October 2016, Amazon released the Paperwhite 3 "Manga Model" in Japan that has a 33% increase in page-turning speed and includes 32 GB of storage, which is space for up to 700 manga books. The Manga model launched at 16,280 yen (~$156) for the ad-supported Wi-Fi version or 12,280 yen (~$118) for Prime members.

The Verge rated the Paperwhite 3 as 9.0 of 10, saying that "The Kindle Paperwhite is the best e-reader for most people by a wide margin" and liked the high-resolution screen but disliked that there was no adaptive backlight; this is featured on the Kindle Voyage. Popzara called the 2015 Paperwhite "the best dedicated E Ink e-reader for the money."

=== Eighth generation ===
==== Kindle Oasis (first iteration) ====
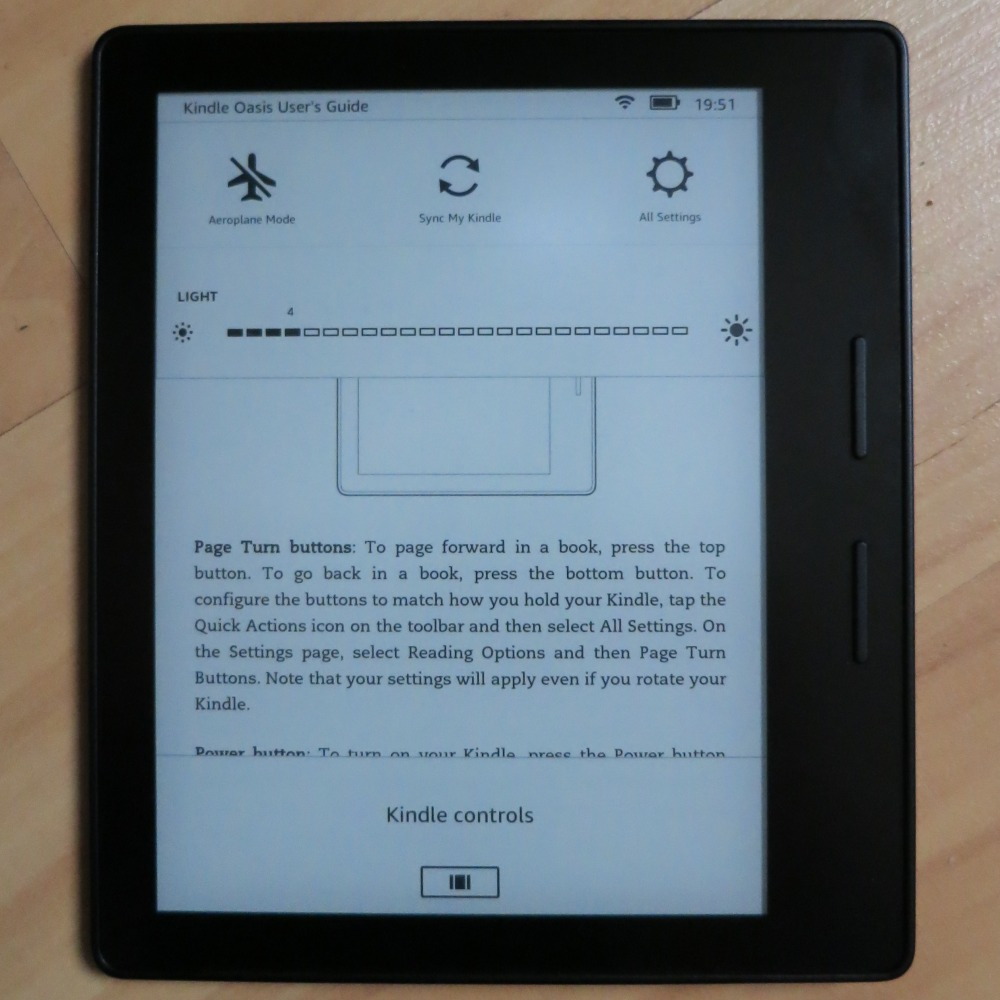
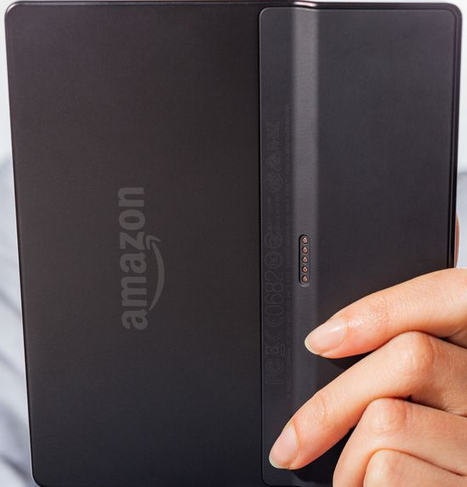
Kindle Oasis

Amazon announced the first-iteration Kindle Oasis on April 13, 2016, and it was released on April 27 worldwide. The Kindle Oasis is available in Wi-Fi and Wi-Fi + 3G models. The Oasis has a 6-inch, 300 ppi E Ink Carta HD display with ten LEDs. Its asymmetrical design features physical page turn buttons on one side and it has an accelerometer so the display can be rotated for one-hand operation with either hand. It has one thicker side that tapers to an edge that is 20% thinner than the Paperwhite. It includes a removable leather battery cover for device protection and increased battery life that is available in either black, walnut (brown) or merlot (red); the cover fits in the tapered edge. The Oasis has 28 hours of battery life if used with the battery cover with Wi-Fi off. However, without the cover, the Oasis battery lasts about seven hours. It has nearly 3 GB of user storage. The Oasis includes the Bookerly (serif) font and it is the first Kindle to include the Amazon Ember (sans-serif) font.

The Guardian's reviewer praised the Oasis's ease for holding, its lightweight design, long battery life, excellent display, even front lighting, usable page-turn buttons, and the luxurious cover. However, the reviewer believed the product was overpriced, noted that the battery cover only partially protects the back, and that the reader is not waterproof. The reviewer concluded, "…the Paperwhite will likely be all the e-reader most will need, but Oasis is the one you'll want. The Oasis is the Bentley to the Paperwhite's Golf – both will get the job done, just one is a cut above the other." The Verge rated the Oasis as 9 of 10, praising its thinness, its weight without the cover and the ability to read with one hand, but did not like that it is so expensive, has no adaptive backlight like the Voyage and it is not waterproof.

==== Kindle 8 ====
Kindle 8 displaying the title page of an e-book from Project Gutenberg

Amazon's upgrade of the standard Kindle was released on June 22, 2016, in both black and white colors ($80 ad-supported, $100 no ads). The Kindle 8 features a new rounded design that is 0.35 inches (9 mm) shorter, 0.16 inches (4 mm) narrower, 0.043 inches (1.1 mm) thinner, and 1.1 ounces (30 g) lighter than the previous Kindle 7, and features double the RAM (512 MB) of its predecessor. The Kindle 8 is the first Kindle to use Bluetooth that can support VoiceView screen reader software for the visually impaired. It has the same screen display as its predecessor, a 167 ppi E Ink Pearl touch-screen display, and Amazon claims it has a four-week battery life and can be fully charged within four hours.

=== Ninth generation ===
==== Kindle Oasis (second iteration) ====
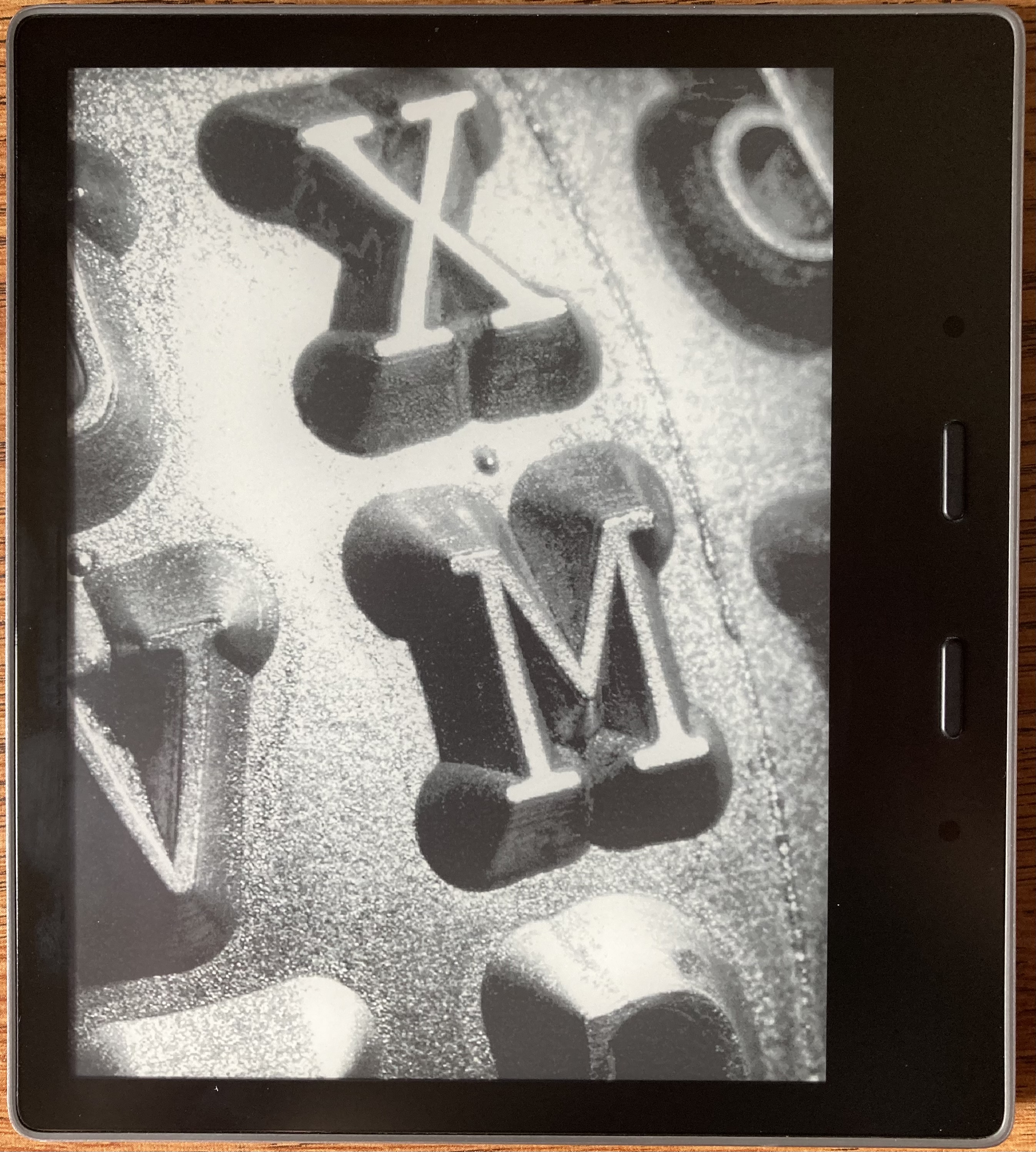
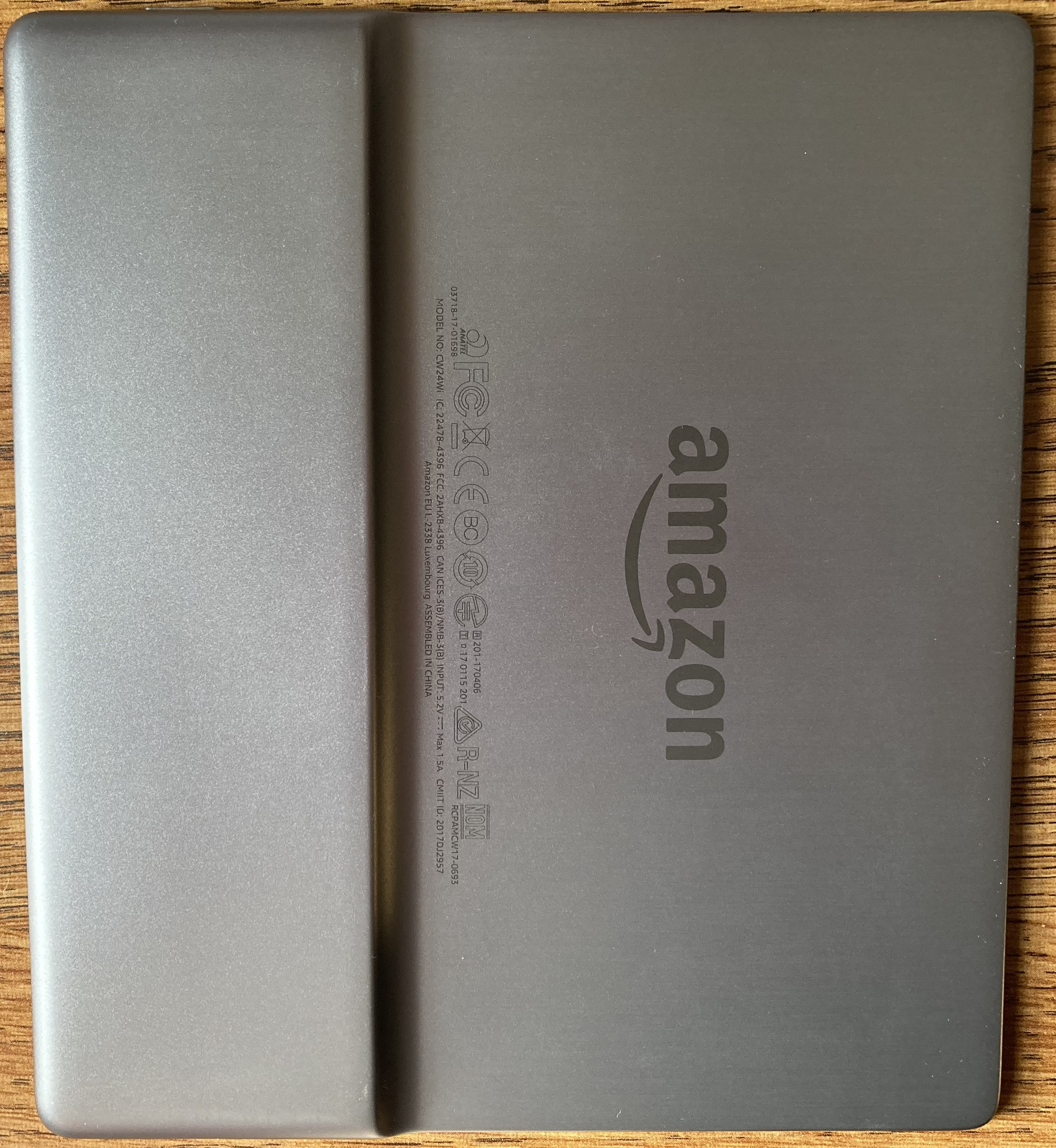
Kindle Oasis 2 9th gen, front and rear

Amazon released the second-iteration Kindle Oasis, marketed as the "All-New Kindle Oasis" and colloquially referred to as the Oasis 2, on October 31, 2017. It is available in 8 GB Wi-Fi, 32 GB Wi-Fi and 32 GB Wi-Fi + 3G ($350 no ads) models with a 7-inch E Ink display with 300 ppi. It has an asymmetric design like the first-iteration Oasis, so it works for one-handed use, and the device finish is made from aluminum. The device has a black front, with either a silver or gold colored back. The Oasis 2 is the first Kindle to be IPX8 rated so it is water-resistant up to two meters for up to 60 minutes, and first to be able to change the background black and the text to white. It is frontlit with 12 LEDs, and has ambient light sensors to adjust the screen brightness automatically. It supports playback of Audible audiobooks by pairing with A2DP supported external Bluetooth 4.2 speakers or headphones; the device can store up to 35 audiobooks with 8 GB or 160 audiobooks with the 32 GB model. The Oasis 2's internal battery lasts about six weeks of reading at 30 minutes a day which is about 21 hours.

The Verge gave the Oasis 2 a score of 8 of 10, praising its design, display, and water resistance, but criticizing its high cost and inability to read an e-book while its related audiobook is playing. TechRadar rated it as 4.5 of 5, saying the Oasis 2 is expensive but it praises as the best e-reader at the time with its lovely metal design, waterproofing and great reading experience.

=== Tenth generation ===
==== Kindle Paperwhite (fourth iteration) ====
Amazon announced the fourth-iteration Kindle Paperwhite on October 16, 2018, and released it on November 7, 2018; it is colloquially referred to as the Paperwhite 4 and Paperwhite 2018. It is available in 8 GB Wi-Fi, 32 GB Wi-Fi and 32 GB Wi-Fi + 4G LTE models. It features a 6-inch plastic-backed display of Amazon's own design with 300 ppi and a flush screen featuring five LED lights. It is waterproof with an IPX8 rating, allowing submersion in 2 meters of fresh water for up to one hour. It supports playback of Audible audio books only by pairing with external Bluetooth speakers or headphones.

The Verge rated the Paperwhite 4 as 8.5 of 10, praising its great display, water-resistance and battery life but criticizing its lack of physical buttons and no USB-C support.

==== Kindle (10th generation) ====
Amazon announced the Kindle (10th generation) on March 20, 2019, which features the first front light available on a basic Kindle. The front light uses 4 LEDs compared to the Paperwhite with 5 LEDs. Kindle 10 uses a 6-inch display with higher contrast than previous basic Kindles and has the same 167 ppi resolution. It has black and white colors.

==== Kindle Oasis (third iteration) ====
Amazon released the third-iteration Kindle Oasis, colloquially referred to as the Oasis 3, on July 24, 2019. Externally it is nearly identical in appearance to the second-iteration Oasis, with a similar 7-inch, 300 ppi E Ink display, adjustable warm light, one-handed design, waterproofing, aluminium exterior, Bluetooth support and Micro USB for charging. It adds a 25 LED front light that can adjust color temperature to warmer tones, the first Kindle to be able to do so. This device is available in two different colors; Graphite or Champagne Gold.

The Verge gave the Oasis 3 an 8 out of 10 rating, praising its design, display, and warmer E Ink display, but criticizing its high cost, no USB-C support and the lackluster update over the 2017 model. Amazon removed the Oasis 3 from the US market in late February 2024, after an unusually long sales period of nearly five years without a hardware change, and without a new model to succeed it. Press were told in October 2024 that Amazon had no plans to build new devices with buttons, and would not stock more Oasis units once existing inventory was depleted.

=== Eleventh generation ===
==== Kindle Paperwhite (fifth iteration) ====
Amazon announced the Kindle Paperwhite (fifth iteration) on September 21, 2021, and it was released on October 27, 2021. It features 8 GB of storage and has similar dimensions to its predecessor but has a larger 6.8-inch display set in thinner bezels, 17 LEDs in the front light that can adjust color temperature to warmer tones (first featured in Kindle Oasis 3), an updated processor, and longer battery life that Amazon claims lasts up to ten weeks on a single charge. It is the first Kindle with a USB-C port. The Paperwhite 5 is also available in a higher cost Signature Edition that additionally supports Qi wireless charging, has 32 GB of storage, and includes an ambient light sensor that automatically adjusts the front light brightness. Amazon has stated that some Qi chargers are incompatible and recommends using an Amazon charging dock. The Verge gave the Kindle Paperwhite (fifth iteration) 8.5 out of 10, praising the display and battery but did not like the lack of physical buttons and no improvement of Kindle software support for e-books found outside of the Kindle Store. In September 2022, a model with 16 GB of storage was added.

==== Kindle (11th generation) ====
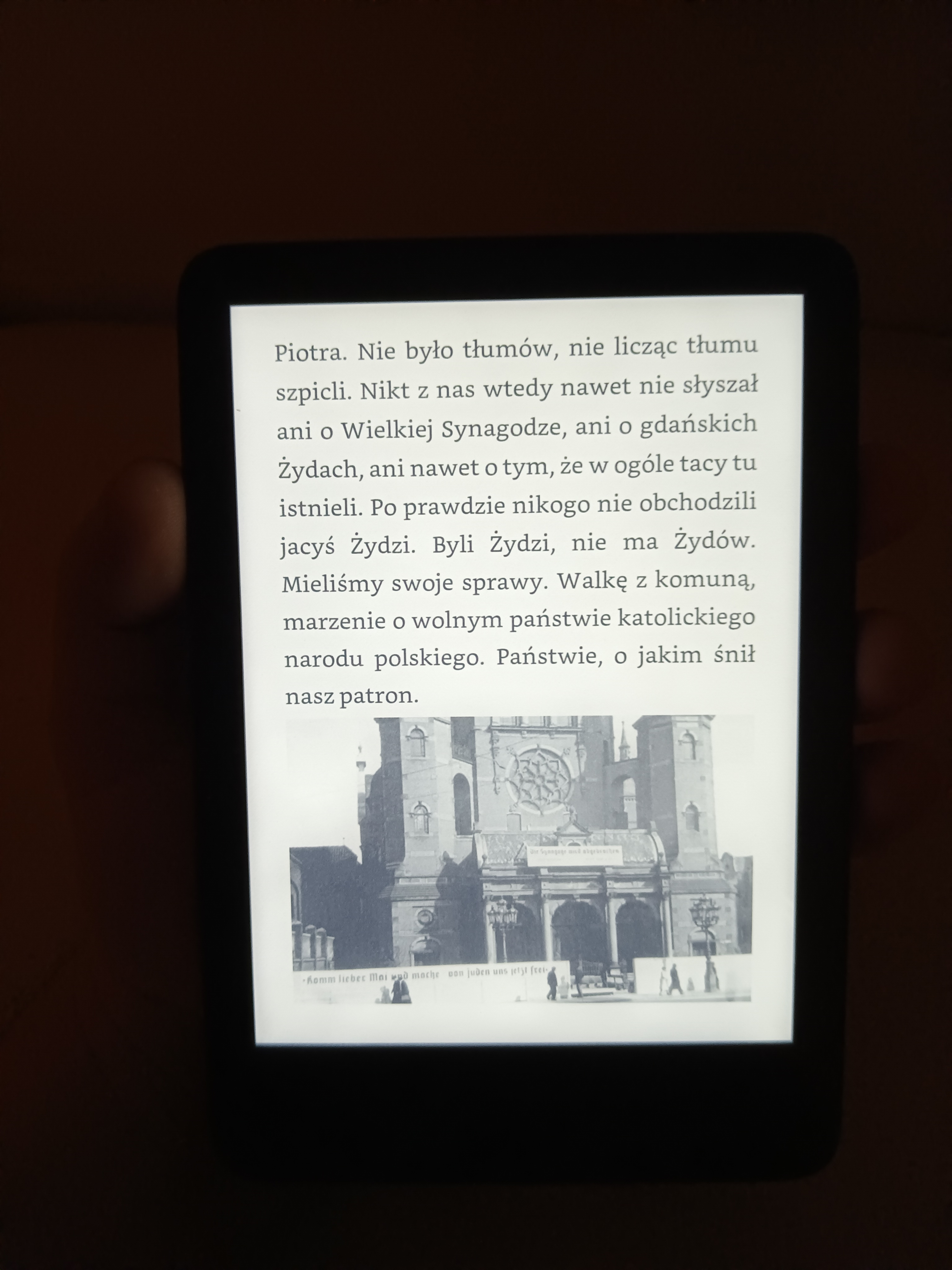
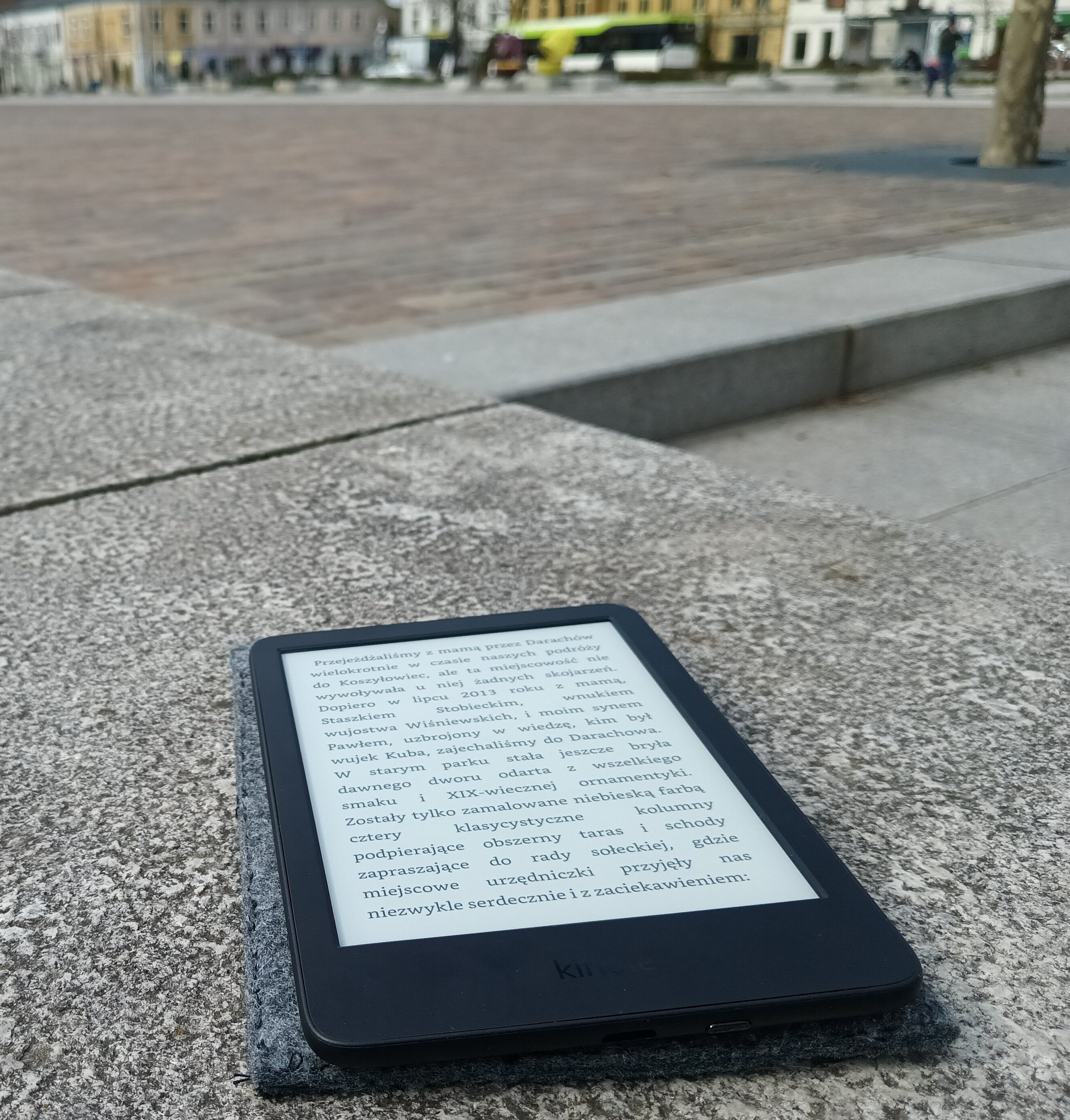
Kindle 11th gen, International release (C2V2L3). Night and day display comparison.

Amazon announced the Kindle (11th generation) on September 17, 2022. It is upgraded with a 300 ppi display, 16 GB of storage, and includes a USB-C port.

==== Kindle Scribe ====
Amazon announced the Kindle Scribe on September 22, 2022, with a release date of November 30. It is the first Kindle to include a 10.2 inch, 300 ppi display, and stylus functionality for writing. Additionally, it is also the first Kindle sold without an option for a discounted ad-supported model since the Kindle Keyboard was introduced in 2010. Owners can choose to enable Special Offers but do not receive a discount or reimbursement for doing so. Amazon offers two Wacom EMR compatible stylus pens for use with the Scribe: a basic pen and a premium pen. Both pens feature standard Wacom interchangeable nibs and magnetic attachment to the edge of the Scribe, and have pressure and tilt features. The premium pen adds an eraser to the end and a configurable shortcut button on the pen body. Either stylus is available for purchase separately.

The Scribe is offered in three storage tiers: 16 GB, 32 GB, or 64 GB. The base 16 GB model is available with either the basic stylus pen or a premium stylus pen. The 32 GB and 64 GB models come with the premium stylus pen.

Upon release the Scribe received mixed reviews, reviewers criticized the lack of software features compared to the competition, but praised the hardware and build quality. The Verge gave the Kindle a 6 out of 10, praising its long battery life, large display size, and pen feel, but noting its "lackluster software" and "outdated document syncing" held the device back.

Amazon released several firmware updates that added features that were missing at the original release. New features in Scribe firmware include:

1. Conversion of handwriting to text during document export
2. Lasso select tool with cut, copy, and paste between notebook pages, different notebooks, and Sticky Notes
3. Enhanced handling of PDFs uploaded and converted via Send to Kindle
4. Added Store content and categories for "Write-on Books" or "On-page writing"

=== Twelfth generation and 2024 releases ===
Amazon announced a revamp of the entire Kindle family on October 16, 2024. The line up includes an updated basic Kindle with a brighter frontlight, a new Paperwhite with a 7" display, an all new Kindle Colorsoft Signature Edition with a 7" E Ink Kaleido display based on the new Paperwhite, and a redesigned Scribe with an updated display and more advanced software.

==== Kindle 11 (2024 release) ====
The 2024 Kindle has an updated display with brighter LEDs, and is available in black or matcha body colors. It remains part of the 11th generation.

==== Kindle Paperwhite (sixth iteration) ====
The 2024 Kindle Paperwhite increases the screen size to 7" and uses newer screen technology to increase speed and contrast. The Paperwhite increases the base storage to 16 GB. It is available in black, raspberry, and jade body colors. The 2024 Paperwhite Signature Edition has the same enhancements of the new Paperwhite and also retains the extra features from the 2021 SE model. It is available in metallic variants of the Paperwhite body colors.

==== Kindle Colorsoft Signature Edition ====
The new Kindle Colorsoft is based on the hardware and cases of the PW6SE, but has an all-new Kaleido-based 7" display. The display includes customization of E Ink Kaleido display layers to increase optical performance. It is only available in the Metallic Black body color. It was released October 30, 2024.

==== Kindle Scribe (2024 release) ====
The 2024 release of the Kindle Scribe includes a redesigned front face with white bezels, a new color-matching Premium stylus pen with a soft rubber eraser, and otherwise retains the hardware and feature specifications of the original Scribe. The base 16 GB Scribe now includes the Premium stylus pen, and has a corresponding price increase. The Basic stylus pen was not updated for the new models and is not available to be bundled with them. The Scribe is available in Metallic Jade and Tungsten body colors that carry over to the ledger on the front. Amazon considers this model to still be in the first generation of Scribe, as a 2024 release. It was released on December 4, 2024.

Amazon announced several software features of the new Scribe, which were also to be later added to the original Scribe via firmware updates. They include the ability to write directly on reflowable e-books with Active Canvas, where book text will reflow around a resizeable box containing handwriting, and a new side panel called Extended Margin, where handwriting can be scrolled and can be hidden or popped out. New Notebook features include refining handwriting into a new script typeface and LLM genAI-powered summaries of refined notebooks.

On December 4, 2024, firmware 5.17.2 was made available for the Kindle Scribe 2022 release. It includes the Active Canvas, highlight enhancements, and AI Notebook Tools that were shown during the debut announcement of the 2024 release. This coincides with the official public availability of the 2024 release hardware. The Extended Margin feature was not available until the firmware 5.17.3 release, on February 5.

=== Twelfth generation 2025 release ===
==== Kindle Colorsoft (2025 release) ====
On July 24, 2025, Amazon announced a cheaper Colorsoft model, with half the storage of the Signature model and no wireless charging or ambient light sensor. It is only available in black body color. A Kids Edition based on the new model was also announced.

=== 2025 devices and services announcement ===
On September 30, 2025, Amazon announced a new Scribe lineup that revised the case design, and includes a Kindle Scribe Colorsoft model. The display stack was redesigned to be thinner and allow system components to be moved under the display, removing the need for an asymmetric display bezel. The display size was increased to 11 inches diagonal, while maintaining the common 300 dpi resolution of E Ink Carta HD. All new models include a new Premium Pen stylus. All models are available in Graphite body color that comes with a white stylus pen, and Colorsoft Fig body color models come with a matching Fig stylus pen. Amazon calls the B&W Scribe models Kindle Scribe (3rd Generation), and the color model is called Kindle Scribe Colorsoft (1st Generation). This naming introduces an inconsistency, as the previous Scribe release is called Kindle Scribe 1st generation - 2024 release. Amazon product pages do not have Scribe models shown as part of a 2nd generation.

Amazon announced significant changes to the software on the Scribe including a new Home screen, a new Workspace, and new integrations to 3rd party services. These changes are only available on the 2025 models.

==== Kindle Scribe without FrontLight ====
Introduced as the lowest-cost option, this model does not have a built-in light and is only available with 16 GB of storage. The bezel is light gray with a white Kindle logo.

==== Kindle Scribe ====
This model includes a built-in FrontLight and is available with 32 GB or 64 GB of storage. The bezel is white with a gray Kindle logo.

==== Kindle Scribe Colorsoft ====
This model includes a Colorsoft display panel, using a customized E Ink Kaleido stack to display colors, and is available with 32 GB or 64 GB of storage. It is available in either Graphite or Fig body color, though Fig is available as an option only with the 64GB model. The Graphite body color has a dark gray bezel with a light gray Kindle logo, while the Fig body color has a Fig bezel with a pink Kindle logo.

== Official accessories ==
=== Cases ===
Several cases and covers have been produced for all Kindle models, with official branded covers from Amazon along with a large third-party market of varying designs.

The original Kindle design was bulky and asymmetric designed to be held like a paperback book, with a rubberized rear cover panel for grip. The Kindle 2 was redesigned to be used with an official Amazon leather cover. It had a much thinner chassis with a smooth metal rear cover. Two small slots in the left edge are used to clip into the official case. The Kindle 3 (Kindle Keyboard) included power pass through via the cover clips, to power a pull-out light. The Kindle 4/5/Touch cover design is form-fit to the Kindle and power for the flip-up light is passed through pogo pins at the bottom of the rear chassis.

With the release of the Kindle Paperwhite in 2012 a light in the cover was no longer necessary. Amazon released a natural leather cover and a plastic back that is form-fitted for the device that weighs 5.6 ounces, removing some of the bulk of the previous lighted covers. The cover closes book-like from the left edge. Magnets activate the sleep/wake function in the Kindle when the front is either closed or opened. The subsequent Amazon covers include this function.

As a cost reduced model, the Kindle 7 (2014) did not have a front light and also did not have provisions for powering a cover light. Official Amazon covers were simple and only included sleep/wake functionality and multiple color options.

With the release of the Voyage in 2014, Amazon released two covers made with polyurethane or leather. The Voyage attaches to the rear of the Protective Cover magnetically and the case's cover folds over the top, and the case weighs 4.6 ounces. The case can fold into a stand, propping the Kindle up for hands-free reading.

The Oasis was released in 2016 with a case that added extra battery capacity via a pogo pin connection similar to earlier lighted covers. The case was called the Leather Charging Cover. The subsequent Oasis models removed this feature and used their larger size to include a larger built-in battery.

Covers for the Oasis 2 in 2017 added multiple kinds of material and colors: Fabric became available in Charcoal, Marine Blue, and Punch Red colors, Leather in Black and Merlot colors, and Premium Leather in a distressed brown.

With the release of the Paperwhite 4 in 2018, Amazon released three versions of its cover: a water-safe fabric cover that can withstand brief exposure to water, a standard leather cover and a premium leather cover; these covers all weigh 4 ounces.

Kids Edition bundles often feature covers with whimsical and bright designs. Some include branding or themes to tie in to popular books series such as Warrior Cats. Non-bundled exclusives have also been produced such as a branded covers for The Hunger Games.

Cork was introduced as a new cover material for the Paperwhite 5 in 2021. In 2024 for the Paperwhite 6, Amazon introduced a fabric cover and a new plant-based leather crafted in Italy as a sustainable alternative to leather.

The Scribe was released with covers that flip and fold, and also have a loop to securely hold the stylus. The Scribe fits into the covers with magnets. The front flap is held closed or open, either flat or as a kickstand, with magnets. Cut outs on both sides allows the stylus to be magnetically attached to the side of Scribe as normal and with the cover open or closed.

=== Audio adapter ===
In May 2016, Amazon released the official Kindle Audio Adapter for reading e-books aloud via a text-to-speech (TTS) system for the blind and visually impaired. This accessibility accessory, initially supported only for the Paperwhite 3 and Oasis, plugs in the USB port and connects to headphones or speakers. Once connected, the reader uses the Voiceview for Kindle feature to navigate the interface and listen to e-books via TTS. This feature only supports e-books, not audiobooks or music.

Using the accessory reduces the Paperwhite 3's battery life to six hours. As an alternative to the official adapter, a generic USB to audio converter will also work with Voiceview.

=== Wireless charger ===
With the release of the 2021 Paperwhite Signature Edition, Amazon announced the Wireless Charging Dock which supports Qi charging up to 7.5 W.
