= X-Ray (Amazon) =

Amazon Kindle reference tool

X-Ray is a reference tool, introduced in September 2011, that is incorporated in the Amazon Kindle Touch and later models, Kindle apps for mobile platforms, Amazon Fire tablets, Fire TVs and Amazon Prime Video streaming apps, and the discontinued Fire Phone. On the Kindle, general reference information is preloaded into a small file on the Kindle device or app, so that when the feature is used, there is no need to access the Internet to refer to such content as dictionary and encyclopedic information, metadata, or biographical info about actors featured in a film.

== Description ==
X-Ray is a tool to explore the contents of books or other media in more depth. As Amazon describes X-Ray for Kindle: "X-Ray lets you explore the 'bones of a book.' You can also view more detailed information from Wikipedia and from Shelfari, Amazon's community-powered encyclopedia for book lovers." After Shelfari closed in 2016, information from Goodreads was displayed in the X-Ray tool.

X-Ray operates like a concordance, listing most commonly used character names, locations, themes, or ideas, which are sorted into the two main categories of "People" and "Terms". For example, readers can use it to look up the first occurrence of characters, which is often helpful in many-charactered novels.
