= List of PDF software =

This is a list of links to articles on software used to manage Portable Document Format (PDF) documents. The distinction between the various functions is not entirely clear-cut; for example, some viewers allow adding of annotations, signatures, etc. Some software allows redaction, removing content irreversibly for security. Extracting embedded text is a common feature, but other applications perform optical character recognition (OCR) to convert imaged text to machine-readable form, sometimes by using an external OCR module.

== Terminology ==
- Creators – to allow users to convert other file formats to PDF.
- Viewers – to allow users to open, read and print PDF files.
- Editors – to allow users to edit or otherwise modify PDF files.
- Converters – to allow users to convert PDF files to other formats.

== Multi-platform ==
| Name | License | Platforms | | | | Converts PDF to other format | Edits existing PDF | Description |
| Name | License | Linux | Mac | Windows | Other | Converts PDF to other format | Edits existing PDF | Description |
|---|---|---|---|---|---|---|---|---|
| Adobe Acrobat | Proprietary | No | Yes | Yes | Android, iOS, iPadOS and Online | Yes | Yes | View, create, manipulate, print and manage files in PDF. |
| Apache OpenOffice | GNU LGPLv3 | Yes | Yes | Yes | | Yes | | Import from PDF (with restrictions) (after installing an extension), export as PDF including PDF/A. |
| Apache OpenOffice Draw | GNU LGPL | Yes | Yes | Yes | | | Yes | PDF import via software, or extensions. |
| Apache PDFBox | Apache License 2.0 | Yes | | Yes | Unix | Yes | | Converts PDF to other file format (text, images, html). |
| Collabora Online | MPLv2.0 | Yes | Yes | Yes | Android, iOS, iPadOS, ChromeOS and Online | Yes | Yes | Import from PDF, export as PDF 2.0, PDF/A-1b > PDF/A-4 |
| DocHub | Proprietary, freemium | | | | Android, iOS, Web | Yes | Yes | Online PDF editing and document signing platform. Available via browser, mobile app, and browser extensions. |
| Foxit Software | Proprietary | No | Yes | Yes | Android, iOS, iPadOS and Online | Yes | Yes | View, create, manipulate, print and manage files in PDF. |
| GIMP | GNU GPL | Yes | Yes | Yes | | Yes | | Converts PDF to raster images. |
| ImageMagick | ImageMagick License | Yes | Yes | Yes | | Yes | | Converts PDF to raster images and vice versa. |
| Inkscape | GNU GPL | Yes | Yes | Yes | | Yes | Yes | Import-/Export- from multipage PDF to multipage PDF or (Vector-)graphics. |
| Karbon | GNU GPL/LGPL | Yes | Yes | No | BSD, Solaris/Illumos | | Yes | Import PDF with multiple pages as layouts, export as a one-page PDF. All standard vector graphics editor features. |
| LibreOffice | GNU LGPLv3 / MPLv2.0 | Yes | Yes | Yes | | Yes | | Import from PDF (extension included by default), export as PDF 2.0, PDF/A-1b > PDF/A-4 |
| LibreOffice Draw | GNU LGPLv3 / MPLv2.0 | Yes | Yes | Yes | | Yes | Yes | PDF viewing and limited editing. |
| Mobipocket Creator | Proprietary | | | Yes | | Yes | | Import from PDF and create HTML and MOBI output. |
| Serif PagePlus | Proprietary | | | Yes | | | Yes | Desktop publishing (DTP) application allows opening and editing of PDF documents; Allows compatible saving as PDF 1.3, 1.4, 1.5 and 1.7 and supports also PDF/X1, PDF/X1a and PDF/X-3. |
| pdf-parser | Public Domain | | | | Python script | Yes | | Extraction and analysis tool, handles corrupt and malicious PDF documents. |
| PDF Arranger | GNU GPL | Yes | Yes | Yes | FreeBSD | Yes | Yes | Merge, split, rotate, crop, and rearrange PDF pages; export to raster images. Supports booklet generation, page overlay/underlay, and preservation of outlines and hyperlinks. Successor to PDF-Shuffler. |
| PDFedit | GNU GPL | Yes | | Yes | BSD | | Yes | Software to view or edit the internal structures of PDF documents, and merge them. |
| pdfFiller | Proprietary | Yes | Yes | Yes | Android, iOS, Web browser, Online | Yes | Yes | Online PDF editor and document signing solution with a 30-day free trial. Supports editing, annotating, fillable forms, and eSignatures. Includes a library of over 1 million templates and AI-powered document tools. |
| PDFtk | GNU GPL | Yes | Yes | Yes | FreeBSD, Solaris | | Yes | Command-line tools to edit and convert documents; supports filling of PDF forms with FDF/XFDF data. GUI front-end exists (see PDFChain). |
| PDFsam Basic | AGPLv3 for version 3, GPLv2 for previous versions 2.x | Yes | Yes | Yes | | | | Desktop application to split, merge, extract pages, rotate and mix PDF documents. |
| PDF Studio | Proprietary | Yes | Yes | Yes | | | Yes | Full feature PDF editor. |
| Poppler-utils | GNU GPL | Yes | | Yes | Unix | Yes | | Converts PDF to other file format (text, images, html). |
| pstoedit | GNU GPL | Yes | | Yes | Unix | Yes | | Converts PostScript to (other) vector graphics file format. |
| QPDF | Apache License 2.0 | Yes | | Yes | | Yes | | Structural, content-preserving transformations from PDF to PDF. |
| Scribus | GNU GPL | Yes | Yes | Yes | Unix, GNU/Hurd, Haiku, OS/2 | Yes | | Export PDF and many other formats, multi-pages and multi-layers. Supports JS forms Cannot edit PDF Files. |
| SignNow | Proprietary | | | | Android, iOS, Web | | Yes | Online document signing and PDF editing platform. |
| Smallpdf Desktop | Proprietary | | Yes | Yes | | Yes | Yes | Supports merging, splitting, and extracting pages from PDFs. Also rotating, deleting and reordering pages. Converts PDF to Word, Excel, PowerPoint, raster images. |
| Soda PDF | Proprietary | | | Yes | | Yes | Yes | Modular PDF software. |
| Solid Converter PDF | Proprietary | | Yes | Yes | | Yes | | PDF to Word, Excel, HTML and Text; supports passwords, text editing, and batch conversion. |
| SWFTools | GNU GPL | Yes | Yes | Yes | | Yes | | SWF conversion and manipulation suite containing a standalone PDF to SWF converter along with a Python gfx API (requires Xpdf). |

=== Development libraries ===
These are used by software developers to add and create PDF features.

| Name | License | Description |
|---|---|---|
| Apache PDFBox | Apache License | Java developer library for creating, view, extract, print PDF files. |
| BIRT Project | EPL 2.0 | Open-source Java based Business Intelligence and Reporting Tools (BIRT) that can create output into PDF, HTML, Web Viewer, Microsoft XLS, XLSX, Doc, Docx, PPT, PPTX, ODT, ODS, ODP, Postscript, comma-separated values and XML files and can be integrated into websites or extended for individual formats and database output. |
| Formatting Objects Processor | Apache License | Open-source print formatter driven by XSL Formatting Objects and an output independent formatter; main output target is PDF. |
| Flying Saucer | LGPL | Cross-platform Java library for rendering XML, XHTML and CSS 2.1 content, usable to output PDF. |
| iText | Proprietary/AGPL | Library to create and manipulate PDF, RTF, HTML files in Java, C#, and other .NET languages. |
| JasperReports | GNU LGPL | Open-source Java reporting tool that can write to screen, printer, or into PDF, HTML, Microsoft Excel, RTF, ODT, comma-separated values and XML files. |
| libHaru | ZLIB/LIBPNG | Open-source, cross-platform C library to generate PDF files. |
| OpenPDF | GNU LGPLv3 / MPLv2.0 | Open source library to create and manipulate PDF files in Java. Fork of an older version of iText, but with the original LGPL / MPL license. |
| PDFsharp | MIT | C# developer library to create, extract, edit PDF files. |
| Poppler | GNU GPL | Open-source multi-backend C++ library derived from Xpdf; no bundled viewer; incl. pdftohtml converter. |
| TCPDF | GNU LGPL | Open-source PHP library to create PDF files. |

=== Creators ===
These create files in their native formats, but then allow users to export them to PDF formats.

| Name | License | Platforms | Description |
|---|---|---|---|
| Adobe Acrobat | Proprietary | Windows, macOS | Desktop PDF authoring suite. |
| Adobe Illustrator | Proprietary | Windows, macOS | Illustrator can save as PDF, and can recognize and edit text and graphics. |
| Collabora Online | MPLv2.0 | Windows, macOS, Linux, Android, iOS, iPadOS, ChromeOS and Online | All Collabora Online applications allow PDF export; supports also PDF/A-4b; since many import formats are supported (e.g., docx, xlsx, pptx, rtf, doc, xls, ppt, odt, others) conversion is also possible. |
| FineReader | Proprietary | Windows, macOS, Linux | OCR tool; can save as PDF, and recognize text from PDF. |
| Ghostscript | Proprietary/AGPL | Linux, Windows, macOS, UNIX | Viewer, creator, converter; supports also PDF/X-3; used by PdfCreator (until v1.7.3 then .NET Framework 4 since v2.0.0), WinPdf, BullzipPdf, CutePDF freeware version and others. |
| Microsoft Office | Proprietary | Windows, macOS | All Microsoft Office products from 2007 version allow users to Save as PDF. |
| WordPerfect | Proprietary | Windows | Word processor with a native "Publish to PDF" export feature. |
| Apache OpenOffice | GNU LGPL | Linux, Windows, macOS | All OpenOffice.org applications allow PDF export; supports also PDF/A; since many import formats are supported (e.g., doc, docx, rtf, xls, ppt) conversion is also possible. |
| LibreOffice | GNU LGPLv3 / MPLv2.0 | Linux, Windows, macOS | All LibreOffice applications allow PDF export; supports also PDF/A-4b; since many import formats are supported (e.g., docx, xlsx, pptx, rtf, doc, xls, ppt, odt, others) conversion is also possible. |
| Serif PagePlus | Proprietary | Windows | Desktop publishing (DTP) application; Allows compatible saving as PDF 1.3, 1.4, 1.5 and 1.7 and supports also PDF/X-1, PDF/X-1a and PDF/X-3. |
| PageStream | Proprietary | Windows, Linux, macOS, Amiga | Cross-platform desktop publishing application to open, edit, export. |
| Prince | Proprietary | Linux, macOS, Windows, Solaris, | Converts HTML, XML, SVG, and MathML to PDF by way of CSS. |
| Scribus | GNU GPL | Linux/UNIX, macOS, OS/2 Warp 4/eComStation and Windows desktops | Cross-platform desktop publishing (DTP) application; supports also PDF/X-3. |
| LaTeX, TeX | LaTeX Project Public License, Permissive | Windows, macOS, Linux | Mark-up language and tools to write technical reports, books, magazines, almost any publication type. |
| LuaTeX | GNU GPL | Windows, macOS, Linux | TeX typesetting system that creates PDF documents. |
| pdfTeX | GNU GPL | Windows, macOS, Linux | TeX typesetting system that creates PDF documents. |
| XeTeX | MIT | Windows, macOS, Linux | TeX typesetting system that creates PDF documents. |

=== Viewers ===
These allow users to view (not edit or modify) any existing PDF file.

| Name | License | Description |
|---|---|---|
| Adobe Reader | Proprietary, freeware | Adobe's PDF reader |
| Adobe Digital Editions | Freeware | E-book and PDF reader from Adobe used for acquiring, managing and reading DRM-protected e-books and PDF documents. |
| Evince | GNU GPL | Universal viewer for GNOME. |
| Foxit PDF Reader | Proprietary, adware | PDF Viewer / Reader for Desktop computer and Mobile Devices. Allows users to add many elements to PDFs (e.g. arrowed comment boxes, text boxes, links, bookmarks, and images). |
| Ghostview | Aladdin Free Public License | A graphical interface for Ghostscript. |
| Javelin PDF Reader | Proprietary, freeware | A full functionality PDF reader with support for DRM using encoded and encrypted PDF files in Drumlin's DRMX and DRMZ formats. |
| Chromium | BSD | Browser includes PDF viewer functionality. Google Chrome (which is based on Chromium) uses the same PDF viewer. Microsoft Edge licenses several Adobe features and branding within its PDF viewer. |
| MuPDF | Proprietary/AGPL | PDF conversion and rendering with anti-aliased graphics. |
| Okular | GNU GPL | Universal viewer by KDE. |
| PDF.js | Apache License 2.0 | A JavaScript library to convert PDF files into HTML5, usable as a web-based viewer that can be included in web browsers. Firefox has PDF.js built-in by default. |
| Qiqqa | Proprietary, freeware | View PDFs in a variety of zoom layouts, annotate, tag, search, cross-reference. |
| Utopia Documents | GNU GPL v3 | Semantic scientific PDF reader (optimized for life sciences and medicine), allows public comments on PDFs, generates on-the-fly link-outs to scientific databases and resources when used while online. |
| XpdfReader | Proprietary, freeware | Multi-platform viewer based on Xpdf library; source and binaries available for Linux, Windows and Macintosh. |

== AmigaOS ==
=== Converters ===
- Antiword: A free Microsoft Office Word reader for various operating systems; converts binary files from Word 2, 6, 7, 97, 2000, 2002 and 2003 to plain text or PostScript; available for AmigaOS 4, MorphOS, AROS x86
- dvipdfm: a DVI to PDF translator with zlib support

=== Viewers ===
- XpdfReader: a multi-platform viewer for PDF files, Amiga version uses X11 engine Cygnix.

== Linux and Unix ==
=== Converters ===
- Collabora Online can be used as a web application, a command line tool, or a Java/Python library. Supported formats include OpenDocument, PDF, HTML, Microsoft Office formats (DOC/DOCX/RTF, XLS/XLSX, PPT/PPTX) and others.

=== Creators, editors and viewers ===
| Name | License | Functions | | | | | | Description |
| Name | License | View | Annotate | Edit | Create | Convert | Library | Description |
|---|---|---|---|---|---|---|---|---|
| Okular | GNU GPL | Yes | Yes | | | | | KDE desktop environment; replaces KPDF. Supports a range of annotation types. Annotations are stored separately from the unmodified PDF file, or (since version 0.15 with Poppler 0.20) can be saved in the document as standard PDF annotations. |
| Evince | GNU GPL | Yes | Yes | | | | | Default PDF and file viewer for GNOME; replaces GPdf. Supports addition and removal (since v3.14), of basic text note annotations. |
| CUPS | Apache License 2.0 | No | No | No | | Yes | | Printing system can render any document to a PDF file, thus any Linux program with print capability can produce PDF files |
| Pdftk | GPLv2 | No | | Yes | | Yes | | Command-line tools to merge, split, en-/decrypt, watermark/stamp and manipulate PDF document files. Front end to an older version of the iText library. |
| poppler | GNU GPL | | | | | Yes | Yes | Utility library for rendering Portable Document Format (PDF) documents. poppler-utils includes command-line tools to extract images from a PDF (pdfimages) and convert a PDF to other formats (pdftohtml, pdftotext, pdftoppm). |
| ps2pdf | GNU AGPL | | | | | Yes | | Part of Ghostscript; converts a PostScript file to a PDF. |
| SWFTools | GNU GPL | | | | | Yes | | pdf2swf component converts PDF to SWF. |
| Scribus | GNU GPL | | | | Yes | | | Open source program for page layout. |
| XpdfReader | GNU GPL | Yes | | | | | Yes | Based on Xpdf open source multi-backend library for viewing and manipulating PDF files. |
| PDF Studio | Proprietary | Yes | | Yes | | | | Software for viewing and editing PDF documents |
| Inkscape | GNU GPL | | | Yes | | | | Technically not a PDF editor, but can be used as such page by page |
| Adobe Reader | Proprietary freeware | Yes | | | | | | Extant versions are obsolete, Adobe has stopped support for Linux. |
| Firefox | MPL | Yes | | | | | | Includes a PDF viewer |
| Google Chrome | Proprietary freeware | Yes | | | | | | Includes a PDF viewer |
| MuPDF | Proprietary/AGPL | Yes | Yes | | | | Yes | Lightweight document viewer. |

== macOS ==
=== Converters ===
- deskUNPDF for Mac: proprietary application from Docudesk to convert PDF files to Microsoft Office, LibreOffice, image, and data file formats

=== Creators ===
- macOS: Creates PDF documents natively via print dialog

=== Editors ===
- Adobe Acrobat: Proprietary PDF authoring suite
- PDF Expert: Proprietary PDF viewer and editor.
- PDF Studio: Proprietary software to view and edit PDF documents.
- PDF Signer: Proprietary; fills forms and embeds image signatures in PDF documents
- PDFgear: Proprietary viewer and editor.

=== Viewers ===
- Safari: This bundled web browser has built-in support for reading PDF documents.
- Firefox: Includes a PDF viewer
- Google Chrome: Includes a PDF viewer
- Preview: macOS's default PDF viewer; in Mac OS X v10.5 and later, it also can rotate, reorder, annotate, insert, and delete pages. It can also merge files, create new files from existing files, and move pages between files
- Adobe Reader: Adobe Systems's reader which is also available for Macintosh; Safari plug-in available
- Skim, an open-source (BSD licence) PDF reader and note-taker for macOS
- Foxit Reader: Proprietary, freeware. Allows users to add elements to PDFs (e.g. arrowed comment boxes, text boxes, links, bookmarks, and images)

== Microsoft Windows ==
=== Converters ===
- Adobe Acrobat: Can convert files into PDF or convert PDF files into other formats
- ABBYY FineReader: Commercial PDF converter which converts PDF into Word (.doc), Excel (.xls), PowerPoint (ppt), and more
- deskUNPDF: PDF converter to convert PDFs to Word (.doc, docx), Excel (.xls), (.csv), (.txt), more
- GSview: File:Convert menu item converts any sequence of PDF pages to a sequence of images in many formats from bit to tiffpack with resolutions from 72 to 204 × 98 (open source software)
- Google Chrome: convert HTML to PDF using Print > Save as PDF.
- gDoc Fusion: Proprietary, shareware; PDF views, edits, converts documents into PDF, XPS or Microsoft Word document; after 30 days a watermark is placed on documents in shareware version
- OmniPage: Converts to and from PDF and other formats with many options.
- Nitro PDF Reader: (Trialware) Extracts Images in original resolution.
- PDF-XChange: PDF Tools and PDF-XChange print driver allow conversion from many formats to PDF. A "lite" version of the print driver is free for non-commercial (home and academic) but places a watermark on documents
- Qiqqa: Converts Microsoft Word document and Web Pages to PDF.
- SWFTools: 'pdf2swf component converts PDF to SWF – command line with GUI wrapper
- poppler-utils a collection of tools builds on poppler to convert PDF contents to everything
- GraphicsMagick: Can convert PDF to PNG or other formats.

=== Creators ===
| Name | License | Freeware version | Description |
|---|---|---|---|
| Bullzip PDF Printer | Proprietary | Yes | Virtual printer, requires Ghostscript and PDFPowerTool. |
| CC PDF Converter | GNU GPL | — | Virtual Printer. Creates a PDF with embedded Creative Commons license from any software. Bundled with optional proprietary Razoss adware and browser tools. |
| CutePDF | Proprietary | Yes | Virtual printer, also with proprietary PDF editor. Attempts to install the Ask Toolbar as well as Hotspot Shield. Can be avoided by using the /no3d command-line switch. Includes OpenCandy adware. |
| deskPDF | Proprietary | No | Available for both client and terminal servers. |
| eCopy PaperWorks / eCopy PDF Pro Office | Proprietary | No | Nuance product |
| Foxit PDF Editor | Proprietary | No | |
| Foxit PDF Printer | Proprietary | Yes | Virtual printer that comes with Foxit PDF Reader or Foxit PDF Editor. |
| gDoc Creator | Proprietary, shareware | No | Enterprise-level creator to create, review, edit, share or archive PDF and XPS documents. After 30 days shareware version places a watermark on documents. |
| HelpNDoc | Proprietary | Yes | Manual and documentation authoring tool with native PDF export. Free for personal use. |
| Mathcad | Proprietary | No | Mathcad worksheets can be saved as PDF files. Save as PDF only available in paid version. |
| Microsoft Print to PDF | Proprietary | Yes | A built-in virtual printer with Windows since Windows 10. |
| Mountains | Proprietary | No | Image analysis and desk top publishing software dedicated to microscope users, and distributed under different brands by most microscope manufacturers. The pages produced can be saved into proprietary format, RTF and PDF. |
| Nitro PDF Reader | Proprietary | Yes | As with Adobe Acrobat, Nitro PDF Pro's reader is free; but unlike Adobe's free reader, Nitro's free reader allows PDF creation (via a virtual printer driver, or by specifying a filename in the reader's interface, or by drag-'n-drop of a file to Nitro PDF Reader's Windows desktop icon); Ghostscript not needed. |
| PagePlus | Proprietary | No | Desktop publishing suite with PDF viewing, editing and creation features |
| PaperPort | Proprietary | No | Desktop publishing suite with PDF viewing, editing and creation features |
| PDFCreator | GNU GPL/Proprietary | Yes | Virtual printer for Windows using a custom license called FairPlay. Used Ghostscript GPL until v1.7.3. Now uses .NET Framework 4. Includes adware. |
| PDF24 Creator | Proprietary | Yes | A PDF creator and virtual PDF printer for Microsoft Windows |
| PDF-XChange | Proprietary | Yes | PDF Tools allows creation of PDFs from many types of source input (images, scans, etc.). The PDF-XChange print driver allows printing directly to a PDF. A "lite" version of the print driver is free for non-commercial (home and academic) use. |
| PrimoPDF | Proprietary | Yes | Virtual printer, for Microsoft .NET Framework and uses Ghostscript and RedMon. Connects with www.primopdf.com. Includes Open Candy adware. |
| Solid PDF Creator | Proprietary | No | |
| Universal Document Converter | Proprietary | No | Virtual printer. It doesn't use Ghostscript. |
| Xara Photo & Graphic Designer | Proprietary | No | Graphic design software with PDF creation plus import, viewing and limited editing |

=== Editors ===
| Name | License | Description |
|---|---|---|
| Adobe Acrobat | Proprietary | Adobe Systems's proprietary desktop PDF authoring suite; includes a virtual printer. |
| Adobe Photoshop | Proprietary | Adobe Systems's Graphic Design software and image editor. |
| Bluebeam Revu | Proprietary | A commercial PDF editor, markup and collaboration product aimed at engineering and architectural markets. |
| Foxit Reader | Freeware | Highlight text, draw lines, measure distances of PDF documents. |
| Foxit PDF Editor | Trialware | Integrated PDF Editing and eSign anywhere. |
| gDoc Fusion | Proprietary/Shareware | desktop product to create, review, edit, share or archive PDF and XPS documents. After 30 days a watermark is placed on documents in shareware version. |
| LibreOffice | Free (Mozilla Public License) | an Office suite; allows to export (and import, with accuracy limitations) PDF files. |
| Microsoft Word (version 2013 or newer) | Proprietary | Desktop software; allows to convert PDF files into an editable Word format. |
| Nitro PDF Reader | Freeware | Text highlighting, draw lines and measure distances in PDF files. |
| Nitro PDF Pro | Proprietary | a proprietary commercial PDF creator/editor with an interface styled after Microsoft Office; replicates most or all features of the Adobe Acrobat full commercial version; offers a separate freeware reader (which also supports PDF creation, annotation, collaboration and signing); Ghostscript not additionally needed. |
| PDF Studio | Proprietary | Proprietary software for viewing and editing PDF documents. |
| pdftk | GNU GPL/Proprietary | command-line tools to manipulate, edit and convert documents; supports filling of PDF forms with FDF/XFDF data. |
| PDFgear | Freeware | Freeware PDF reader, tagger, editor and converter. Allows creation, annotation, signing, editing of text, drawing lines, highlighting of text, measuring distance. |
| PDF-XChange Editor (formerly PDF-XChange Viewer) | Freemium | Freemium PDF reader, tagger, editor (simple editions) and converter (free for non-commercial uses). Allows edit of text, draw lines, highlighting of Text, measuring distance. |
| Solid PDF Tools | Proprietary | Convert PDFs into editable documents and create PDFs from a variety of file sources. |
| WordPerfect (version X4 or newer) | Proprietary | Desktop software that supports PDF editing. |

=== Viewers ===
- ABBYY FineReader PDF Viewer
- Adobe Reader: Adobe's PDF reader is free for personal use.
- Evince: a free (GPL), open source PDF reader. Part of the GNOME desktop environment. A Windows port was available from version 2.28 to version 2.32.
- Foxit Reader: Proprietary/freeware PDF reader, supports FDF import/export, saving filled forms; other extended functionality available via purchasable plugins.
- gDoc Fusion: Proprietary/shareware to view PDF, XPS, Microsoft Word document, Microsoft Excel spreadsheet, Microsoft PowerPoint presentation or image files, included in the evaluation version of the product. Shareware version places a watermark on documents after 30-day eval.
- Google Chrome: Includes a PDF viewer.
- GSview: Open source software and Ghostscript's viewer for Windows.
- Microsoft Edge: Includes a PDF viewer.
- Microsoft Reader: The Microsoft's discontinued Windows 8 PDF viewer.
- Mozilla Firefox: Includes a PDF viewer.
- MuPDF: Free lightweight document viewer.
- Nitro PDF Reader: Freeware (though proprietary) PDF reader and creator. Supports three methods (specifying the file within the reader's interface, or dragging-'n-dropping a file onto the reader's Windows desktop icon, or "printing" to a virtual printer driver) of PDF creation (Ghostscript not additionally needed), saving filled forms (AcroForms), text typewriter, markup/collaboration, and stamp signature (document signing).
- Opera: Includes a PDF viewer.
- PDF-XChange Viewer: Freemium viewer with free OCR, supports FDF/XFDF import/export, saving filled forms, extended markup and export to image capabilities.
- Qiqqa: Freeware PDF reader, indexer, tagger and annotator. Supports OCR and export of PDF text and images.
- Sumatra PDF: A free (GPL), open source PDF reader based on MuPDF. It also supports DjVu, XPS, CHM, Comic Book (CBR, CBT, CBZ and CB7Z) and eBook (EPUB, FB2, FB2Z, PBD, MOBI, PBR, TCR & ZFB2), TXT and image file formats (.tga, .gif, .jpg, .j2k, .png, .webp, .tiff). Supports automatic .pdfsync & .synctex reloading of PDF files so is well favoured as a LaTeX / pdfTeX viewer with forward - inverse synchronization. Using Ghost script it supports PostScript (.ps, .eps) files.
- STDU Viewer: A freeware for non-commercial usage PDF reader. It also supports DjVu, Comic Book Archive (CBR or CBZ), XPS, TIFF, TXT and image file formats.

== Mobile ==
| Name | License | Platform | | | Functions | | Description |
| Name | License | Android | iOS | Other | View | Annotate | Description |
|---|---|---|---|---|---|---|---|
| Amazon Kindle app | Freeware | Yes | Yes | BlackBerry OS, webOS, Windows Phone | Yes | ? | |
| Collabora Online | MPLv2.0 | Yes | Yes | ChromeOS and iPadOS. Also Windows, macOS, Linux and Online | Yes | Yes | |
| Evince | GNU GPL | ? | ? | Maemo | Yes | ? | |
| Foxit PDF Editor | ? | Yes | Yes | | Yes | Yes | |
| Google Drive app | Freeware | Yes | Yes | | Yes | Yes | |
| Notability | Proprietary, freemium | Yes | Yes | macOS, Web | Yes | Yes | Note-taking application with PDF import and annotation features, combining handwritten and typed notes with sketches and audio recordings. |
| Apple Books | Proprietary | No | Yes | | Yes | Yes | |
| MuPDF | GNU AGPL | Yes | Yes | | Yes | No | Lightweight document viewer |
| Qiqqa | Proprietary | Yes | ? | | Yes | Yes | |

== Web-based ==
=== Creators ===
- Collabora Online

=== Converters ===
- Collabora Online supported formats include OpenDocument, PDF, HTML, Microsoft Office formats (DOC/DOCX/RTF, XLS/XLSX, PPT/PPTX) and others.
- Zamzar: Online file converter
- Smallpdf: Offers free (trial) online PDF conversion (PDF to other formats and vice versa)

=== Editors ===
- PDFescape: an advertising and fee supported web service to view, create forms, fill out forms, and edit PDF documents from a web browser (requires JavaScript to be enabled)

=== Viewers ===
- A.nnotate: a web service which views PDF documents as HTML in the browser, with annotation features.
- Docstoc: a web service which allows viewing PDF documents online.
- Issuu: a web service which allows viewing PDF documents online.
- Google Docs: a web service which views PDF documents as PNG images in the browser.
- Scribd: a web service which renders PDF documents as HTML5 in the browser.
- PDF.js: A Javascript-based library, with viewer, and browser extension.

== See also ==
- Commons:Extracting images from PDF
