= PDF24 Creator =

Application for creating and editing PDFs

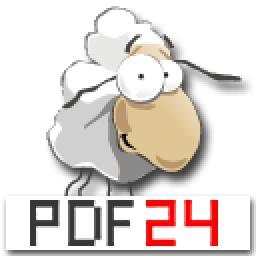
- Developer: geek Software GmbH
- Initial release: July 2006; 19 years ago
- Stable release: 11.30.1 / April 24, 2026; 27 days ago
- Operating system: Microsoft Windows
- Type: PDF printer/creator
- License: freeware
- Website: www.pdf24.org/en/

PDF24 Creator is an application software by Geek Software GmbH for the creation of PDF files from any application and for converting files to the PDF format. The application is released under a proprietary freeware license.

The software has been developed in Germany since 2006, originally under the name PDFDrucker, and is actively developed. It is available in 32 languages, including English and German.

== Functions and features ==
PDF24 Creator is installed as a virtual printer via a device driver in the operating system. This allows PDF files to be created directly from any application that provides a printing function. The commands sent are then used to create a PDF file. PDF24 Creator uses PDFBox, QPDF and Ghostscript, which are automatically installed as a private instances for the PDF24 Creator. After printing a document on the PDF printer, a wizard opens automatically, where the created PDF file can be edited or further worked on.

The PDF24 Creator is also able to merge multiple documents to one PDF file and to extract pages. Compressing PDF files to shrink the file size is also possible. Since version 10.0.0 an added toolbox is present as well.

Some features of the software include, but are not limited to:

- Merge multiple PDF into one file
- Rotating, extracting, inserting pages
- Integrated preview for PDF editing
- PDF encryption, decryption and signing
- Change PDF information (author, title, etc.)
- Compress and shrink PDF files
- Add a watermark or stamp a PDF file
- Combine pages with a digital paper
- Convert to and from PDF
- Multiple PDF printers for different purposes since 7.7.0
- Full featured and lightweight PDF reader since version 8.7.0
- Tesseract OCR engine since version 8.8.0
- Blackening of PDF files since version 10.0.0

== Distribution and fields of application ==
PDF24 Creator is credited with more than 5 million downloads within the top 3 (2017-01-17) in the category "PDF Software" on the German site Chip.de.

== See also ==
- List of PDF software
- List of virtual printer software
