= Timeline of Dropbox =

This is a timeline of online file storage and collaboration service Dropbox.

== Full timeline ==
Year	Month and date	Event type	Details
2005		Competition	Box.net, an online file sharing and content management service for businesses, is launched. It IPOs in March 2014.
2007	June 1	Company	Dropbox is founded by MIT students Drew Houston and Arash Ferdowsi, as a startup company from the American seed accelerator Y Combinator.
2007	August	Competition	Microsoft launches Windows Live SkyDrive (later OneDrive), which also provides users with free storage.
2007	December	Competition	SpiderOak – an online backup and file hosting service that allows users to access, synchronize and share data using a cloud-based server – is launched.
2008	March	Product	Dropbox creates a 3-minute video demonstration of its technology as it is meant to work, which is posted to Digg. This helped its beta waiting list expand from 5,000 people to 75,000 people literally overnight.
2008	September 11	Product	Dropbox launches to the public, allowing anyone to get 2 GB of free storage. It also announces storage pricing tiers, with 50 GB Dropbox for $9.99/month, or $99.99/year.
2009	October	Product	Dropbox acquires the dropbox.com domain for $300,000 in cash.
2009	December	Acquisitions	Steve Jobs approaches Drew Houston and suggests that Drew Houston sell Dropbox. Drew Houston cuts the pitch short and says that Dropbox is determined to stay independent.
2010	May	International	Dropbox announces that it has been blocked by the Chinese government.
2011	June	Security	TechCrunch reports that all Dropbox accounts could be accessed without password for four hours. This was later widely reported in the mainstream press and caused some doubt about Dropbox's "cloud" technology model. The error was caused by an authentication code update.
2012	February	Acquisitions	Dropbox acquires stealth startup Cove.
2012	April	Product	Dropbox announces a new feature allowing users to automatically upload photographs or videos from camera, tablet, SD card, or smartphone. Users will be given up to 3 GB (initially 5 GB) extra space to accommodate the photographs and videos uploaded in this fashion, but the space is permanently added to the user's allowance and is not restricted to pictures. It is viewed as a move against Google's recently launched Google Drive and Microsoft's OneDrive.
2012	November 12	Userbase	Dropbox announces it reaches 100 million users.
2012	December	International	Dropbox announces plans to establish its first international office in Dublin, Ireland.
2012	December 19	Acquisitions	Dropbox acquires Snapjoy, which provides a service for aggregating, archiving and viewing all digital photographs taken with cameras, phones, or popular photo applications.
2013	March	Acquisitions	Dropbox acquires Mailbox, a sleek email platform specifically for mobile users.
2013	June 6	Security	The Guardian and The Washington Post publicize confidential documents suggesting Dropbox was being considered for inclusion in the National Security Agency's classified PRISM program of Internet surveillance.
2013	November 13	Userbase	Dropbox announces it reaches 200 million users.
2013	November 13	Product	Dropbox announces it will unveil Dropbox for businesses.
2014	February	Team	Dropbox hires Dennis Woodside, who ran Motorola Mobility for Google, as its chief operating officer.
2014	April 17	Acquisitions	Dropbox acquires Hackpad, a real-time collaborative text editor.
2014	November 4	Competition	Dropbox announces a partnership with Microsoft to integrate Dropbox and Microsoft Office applications on iOS, Android and the Office 365 applications on the web.
2014	December	Product	Dropbox announces that it will open up its API to business software developers – offering a new set of tools to help integrate Dropbox’s file storage and security features with other business software.
2015	February	Partnerships	Dropbox partners with Vodafone, a British multinational telecommunications company, to offer file storage to Vodafone's 400 million wireless customers.
2015	August 12	Product	Dropbox announces availability of its USB security key which provides two-factor authentication to its services.
2015	October 15	Product	Dropbox rebrands its six-month-old product invite-only beta product Notes as Dropbox Paper, and expands the beta significantly. The product, that facilitates collaborative document editing, is available only on the web at this time.
2015	December	Product	Dropbox announces it will shutter its free mobile apps Mailbox and Carousel as it focuses more on paid file storage by businesses.
2016	March	Product, Competition	Dropbox announces that it now stores over 90% of its user data on its own infrastructure stack as it moves away from Amazon S3.
2016	June 14	Financial	Dropbox CEO Drew Houston announces that the company is free cash flow positive, but is not in a rush to IPO. Commentators note that this does not imply that the company is profitable, since free cash flow does not include a number of expenses.
2016	August 3	Product	Dropbox launches an iPhone and Android version of its document-editing app, Paper, and upgrades it from invite-only beta to open beta.
2016	August 31	Security	Dropbox confirms that a 2012 security incident had exposed hashed passwords and email addresses for more than 69 million user accounts, after a copy of the stolen data began circulating online.
2016	November 16	Product	As part of its AdminX initiative for Dropbox Business users, Dropbox launches additional features to improve security of business documents and prevent people from accessing them through personal accounts. Admin controls are extended to Dropbox Paper. Also, Dropbox announces an infrastructure expansion in Europe and Asia, to cater to its large non-US audience. As of this date, Dropbox has more than 30 security partnerships across areas such as data loss prevention, enterprise mobility management, identity and access management, data migration, eDiscovery, and analytics.
2017	June 19	Product	Dropbox announces plans to further grow its worldwide private network in North America, Europe, and Australia by introducing five new regional accelerators. This move aims to enhance performance and reliability for all its users around the world.
2018	February 15	Financial	Dropbox launches the Dropbox Foundation, which focuses on promoting and protecting human rights by partnering with impactful nonprofits.
2018	March	Financial	Dropbox has successfully secured $756 million for its IPO, with 36 million shares priced at $21 each.
2018	November 6	Product	Dropbox announces Dropbox Extensions, which allow users to initiate workflows directly within Dropbox, e.g. the ability to edit PDFs, to view and edit DWGs, to annotate videos or to send electronic fax. The launch partners are Adobe Sign, DocuSign and HelloSign for electronic signature, Nitro, airSlate and Smallpdf for PDF editing, Autodesk for DWG files, Vimeo for video annotation, Pixlr for image editing and HelloFax for fax.
2019	January 28	Acquisitions	Dropbox announces its acquisition of e-signature software company HelloSign for $230 million. Computerworld later listed HelloSign among six e-signature tools, alongside Adobe Acrobat Sign, DocuSign, Eversign, PandaDoc and signNow.
2019	May	Product	Dropbox announces Rewind, a new feature that can roll back an account to any point in the past 30 days.
2020	October 13	Team	Dropbox is from now on becoming a remote-first company.
2021	March 9	Acquisitions	Dropbox announces its acquisition of document sharing startup DocSend for $165 million.
2021	October 29	Acquisitions	Dropbox announces that an agreement to acquire universal search company Command E has been signed.
2022	November 29	Acquisitions	Dropbox announces that an agreement to acquire several key assets from Boxcryptor has been signed. Boxcryptor is a provider of end-to-end zero-knowledge encryption for cloud storage services.
2022	December 16	Acquisitions	Dropbox announces the acquisition of form management platform FormSwift for $95 million.
2023	June 21	Financial	Dropbox launches Dropbox Ventures, a $50 million venture fund focused on startups in the AI space.
2023	June 21	Product	Dropbox announces Dash, an AI-powered universal search, and Dropbox AI, which uses generative AI to answer questions and summarize large files.
2023	October 10	Product	Dropbox announces Dropbox Studio, a video collaboration tool, that can be used to create, edit, review and publish videos.
2024	May 1	Security	Dropbox discloses that an intruder used a compromised service account to access Dropbox Sign (formerly HelloSign) production systems, obtaining customer emails, usernames, phone numbers, hashed passwords, API keys, OAuth tokens and multi-factor authentication information. Dropbox says it found no evidence that document contents or payment information were accessed.
2024	October 30	Team	Dropbox cuts about 20% of its global workforce, eliminating 528 roles. CEO Drew Houston says the company's core file-sync-and-share business has matured and that its organizational structure had become "overly complex, with excess layers of management."
2026	May 26	Team	Dropbox announces that co-founder and CEO Drew Houston will transition to executive chairman after 19 years leading the company. Ashraf Alkarmi, general manager of Dropbox's core business since 2024, is promoted to co-CEO and is expected to become sole CEO after a transition period. Dropbox also names Michael Torres, a former Google and Amazon executive, as chief product officer effective July 7.
