= List of virtual printer software =

The following is a list of Wikipedia articles relating to virtual printer software:

== Free software ==
The following are distributed under free software licences:

- CC PDF Converter (discontinued) – A Ghostscript-based virtual printer.
- CUPS-PDF – An open source Ghostscript-based virtual printer that can be shared with Windows users over the LAN.
- Ghostscript – A command-line library for creation of PostScript and PDF files.

== Freeware ==
The following are proprietary software but free of charge:

=== Virtual PDF printers ===
Virtual PDF printers for Microsoft Windows:

- Bullzip PDF Printer^{[PUP]} – there is a free version
- CutePDF^{[PUP]}
- PDFCreator^{[PUP]} – a Ghostscript-based virtual printer for Microsoft Windows, with user interface for advanced options (security settings, combining multiple documents, etc.).
- PrimoPDF^{[PUP]}
- Print To PDF - ships with Windows 10 and 11
- PDF24 Creator – a free virtual PDF printer for Microsoft Windows, with user interface and additional tools like merging, splitting, compressing and assembling PDF files.

== Commercial ==
- Adobe Acrobat – Adobe System's commercial PDF authoring suite includes Adobe Distiller, a virtual printer for converting documents to PDF files. Adobe Distiller is not included with the free-to-use Adobe Reader product.

=== Virtual printers ===
Virtual printers for Microsoft Windows:

- Microsoft Office Document Image Writer – Included in Microsoft Office Professional allowing documents to be saved in TIFF or Microsoft Document Imaging Format. MODI is only supported in 32 bit Windows' versions.
- Universal Document Converter – Creating PDF, JPEG, TIFF, PNG, GIF, PCX, DCX and BMP files. Free version adds watermark.

== Notes ==
1.This software has risk of installing potentially unwanted programs. For more information, refer to its main article.
