= PrimoPDF =

- Original author(s): activePDF
- Developer(s): Nitro PDF Software
- Stable release: 5.1.0.2 / July 26, 2010; 14 years ago
- Written in: C, C++, C#
- Operating system: Microsoft Windows
- Platform: Windows
- Type: PDF generator
- License: Proprietary/Freeware
- Website: www.primopdf.com

PrimoPDF is a freeware program that creates PDF files from printable documents on computers running Microsoft Windows. It works as a virtual printer. It does not present the user with advertisements, but does utilize the OpenCandy Adware program, and its terms of service say that it may use OpenCandy to recommend other software to the user. PrimoPDF is developed by the same company that develops the commercial Nitro PDF software. According to the download link on its Web site in February 2023, version 5.1.0.2 remained current.

PrimoPDF requires the Microsoft .NET Framework 2.0. When the program runs, it tries to download automatic updates from www.primopdf.com each time it prints. This feature can be disabled within the program settings. It uses the Ghostscript file format converter and RedMon printer redirection software.

According to its documentation, PrimoPDF has the following features:

- PrimoPDF supports creation profiles (Screen, eBook, Print, Prepress, and Custom) to determine file quality, resolution, and size.
- Can append output to an existing PDF file.
- Supports strong password-based PDF security.
- Allows PDF metadata—including author, title, subject, and keywords—to be set.
- Create files for PDF version 1.2, 1.3, 1.4, or 1.5

The software uses OpenCandy (which includes spyware) to deliver advertisements.

== See also ==
- List of PDF software
- List of virtual printer software
