= PDF Split and Merge =

Open-source PDF utility software

PDFsam Basic

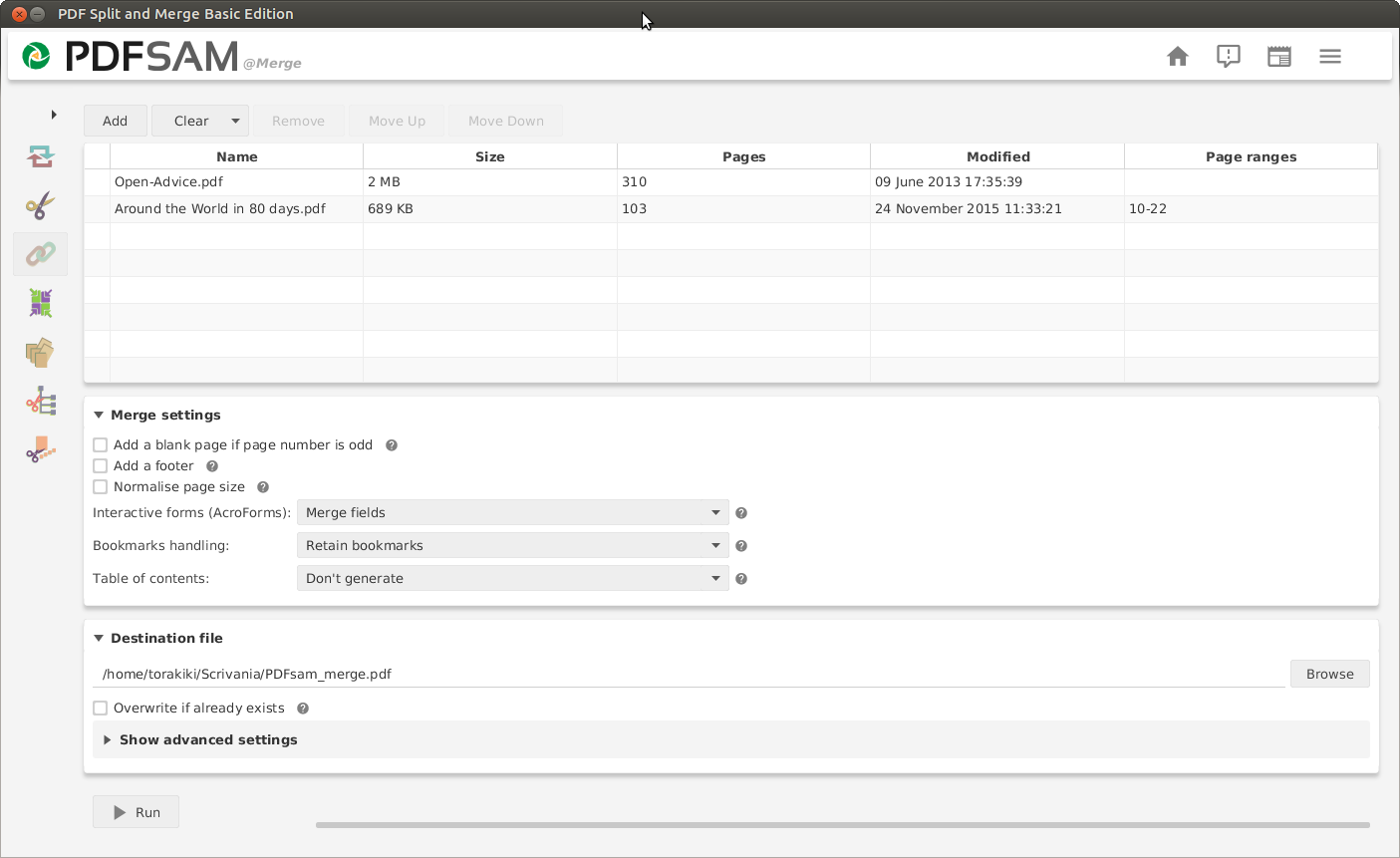
- PDFsam Basic 3.3.2 with merge PDF module opened
- Developer: Andrea Vacondio
- Release: June 29, 2008
- Stable release: 6.0.5 / 5 August 2026; 44 days ago
- Written in: Java, JavaFX
- Operating system: Cross-platform
- Platform: Java
- Type: PDF utility
- License: AGPLv3 for v3, GPLv2 for previous versions 2.x
- Website: pdfsam.org
- Repository: github.com/torakiki/pdfsam

PDFsam Basic or PDF Split and Merge is a free and open-source cross-platform desktop application to split, merge, extract pages, rotate and mix PDF documents. PDFsam uses a freemium model and encourages buying the full version with popups.

== Distribution system ==
PDFsam Basic is a desktop application freely accessible both as source and compiled code. It is available as a MSI package for 32-bit and 64-bit MS Windows, .dmg for macOS, .deb package for Debian based Linux distributions, and ZIP bundle for power users' convenience.

== Functionalities ==
- Merge PDF files selecting entire documents or subsections of them. It provides a number of settings to let the user decide what to do in case the original PDF files contain Acro Forms (Acrobat forms) or an outline (bookmarks) and it can generate a table of contents, normalize pages size and page margins and add blank pages.
- Split PDF files in a number of ways:
  - After every page, even pages or odd pages
  - After a given set of page numbers
  - Every n pages
  - By bookmark level
  - By size, where the generated files will roughly have the specified size
- Rotate PDF files where multiple files can be rotated, either every page or a selected set of pages (i.e. Mb).
- Extract pages from multiple PDF files
- Mix PDF files where a number of PDF files are merged, taking pages alternately from them
- Save and restore of the workspace

== Architecture ==
PDFsam Basic is written in Java and JavaFX. PDFsam Basic relies on Sejda SDK, an open source and task oriented Java library to edit PDF files and SAMBox, a PDFBox fork.

== See also ==
- List of PDF software
- Apache PDFBox
