= Universal 3D =

Compressed file format for 3D graphics

- Filename extension: .u3d
- Internet media type: model/u3d
- Developed by: 3D Industry Forum, Ecma International
- Initial release: August 2005
- Latest release: 4th edition June 2007
- Type of format: File format for 3D computer graphics
- Extended from: XML
- Standard: ECMA-363
- Website: Standard ECMA-363

Universal 3D (U3D) is a compressed file format standard for 3D computer graphics data.

The format was defined by a special consortium called 3D Industry Forum that brought together a diverse group of companies and organizations, including Intel, Boeing, HP, Adobe Systems, Bentley Systems, Right Hemisphere and others whose main focus had been the promotional development of 3D graphics for use in various industries, specifically at this time manufacturing as well as construction and industrial plant design. The format was later standardized by Ecma International in August 2005 as ECMA-363.

The goal is a universal standard for three-dimensional data of all kinds, to facilitate data exchange. The consortium promoted also the development of an open source library for facilitating the adoption of the format.

The format is natively supported by the PDF format and 3D objects in U3D format can be inserted into PDF documents and interactively visualized by Acrobat Reader (since version 7).

== Editions ==
There are four editions to date.

The first edition is supported by many/all of the various applications mentioned below. It is capable of storing vertex based geometry, color, textures, lighting, bones, and transform based animation.

The second and third editions correct some errata in the first edition, and the third edition also adds the concept of vendor specified blocks. One such block widely deployed is the RHAdobeMesh block, which provides a more compressed alternative to the mesh blocks defined in the first edition. Deep Exploration, Tetra4D for Acrobat Pro and PDF3D-SDK can author this data, and Adobe Acrobat and Reader 8.1 can read this data.

The fourth edition provides definitions for higher order primitives (curved surfaces).

== Application support ==
Applications which support PDFs with embedded U3D objects include:

- Adobe Acrobat Pro allows PDF creation and conversion of various file formats to U3D within the PDF. Acrobat Pro allows PDF creation and embedding of pre-created U3D files.
- Adobe Photoshop CS3, CS4 and CS5 Extended are able to export a 3D Layer as a U3D file.
- Adobe Substance 3D rendering software.
- ArchiCAD allows export of U3D files.
- ArtiosCAD allows saving of files to 3D PDF containing U3D.
- Autodesk Inventor allows saving of files to 3D PDF containing U3D. Soon available since version 2017.
- Bluebeam Revu Allows PDF creation and embedding of U3D within the PDF. Comes packaged with plugins that can export 3D PDFs from Revit and Solidworks.
- Daz Studio Allows export to U3D.
- iText open source Java library allows creation of PDF containing U3D
- Jreality, an open source mathematical visualization package with 3D-PDF and U3D export
- KeyCreator allows reading of U3D data from U3D and PDF files and exporting models to U3D and embedding in 3D PDF.
- MeVisLab supports export of U3D models for biomedical images.
- MicroStation allows export of PDF containing U3D.
- PDF-XChange Editor displays 3D PDF containing U3D. It also allows to insert U3D models in an existing PDF document (which has some blank space available) and save it. This applies to both the free and licensed version.
- Poser 7
- Siemens Solid Edge allows exorting and saving of files to 3D PDF containing U3D. And also other 3D file Docs.
- SolidWorks allows saving of files to 3D PDF containing U3D up to release 2014.
- SpaceClaim allows the opening and saving of 3D PDF format comprising U3D.

== See also ==
- glTF
- COLLADA
- PRC (File format)
- X3D
- 3DMLW
- LibHaru
