= VALO-CD =

CD distribution of open-source Windows software

- Stable release: 9 (2013)
- Operating system: Microsoft Windows
- Website: www.valo-cd.net at the Wayback Machine (archived 2021-07-27)

VALO-CD was a distribution of open-source software on a CD for Microsoft Windows aiming to spread knowledge and the use of open-source software. Its last release was in 2013.

VALO-CD originated from Finland, and was originally available only in Finnish. Since version 7's release in March 2012, an international version was made available in English.

The acronym VALO means "Free/Libre Open-Source Software" in Finnish. Valo is also a Finnish word that means "light". The name is intended to connote enlightenment.

The project started in 2008, and aimed to support technological and economic development in Finland.

Version 8 released in 2012 and Version 9 release in 2013.

== Contents ==
Version 8 included the following software:

- Writing and drawing: Dia, GIMP, Inkscape, LibreOffice, and Scribus.
- Internet: Firefox, Thunderbird, Pidgin, Vuze, and WinSCP.
- Recreation: Stellarium, and Tux Paint.
- Multimedia: Audacity, MuseScore and VLC media player.
- Tools: 7-Zip, Evince, InfraRecorder, KeePass, Notepad++, PDFCreator, and TrueCrypt.
- Guides: Various user guides by FLOSS Manuals.
