= WinLibre =

- Final release: 0.3.1 / December 18, 2004; 21 years ago
- Operating system: Windows 3.1, NT 4.0, 98, 2000, Me, XP; Windows Server 2003
- Website: http://www.winlibre.com/en/index.php

WinLibre was a package of free and open source software for Microsoft Windows, in French and English. WinLibre is no longer maintained, as its latest version is 0.3.1 from December 18, 2004. Many of the packages are outdated by several releases.

== Included programs ==
=== Office ===
- OpenOffice.org 1.1.3
- PDFCreator

=== Internet ===
- Mozilla Firefox 1.0
- Mozilla Thunderbird 1.0
- Gaim
- Nvu 0.6.0
- FileZilla

=== Creation ===
- GIMP
- Inkscape 0.40
- Blender 2.35
- Audacity 1.2.3

=== Multimedia ===
- VLC media player 0.8.1
- CDex

=== Tools ===
- 7-Zip
- TightVNC 1.3.5dev6
- ClamWin 0.37.3
