= Foliate (software) =

E-book reading application for Linux

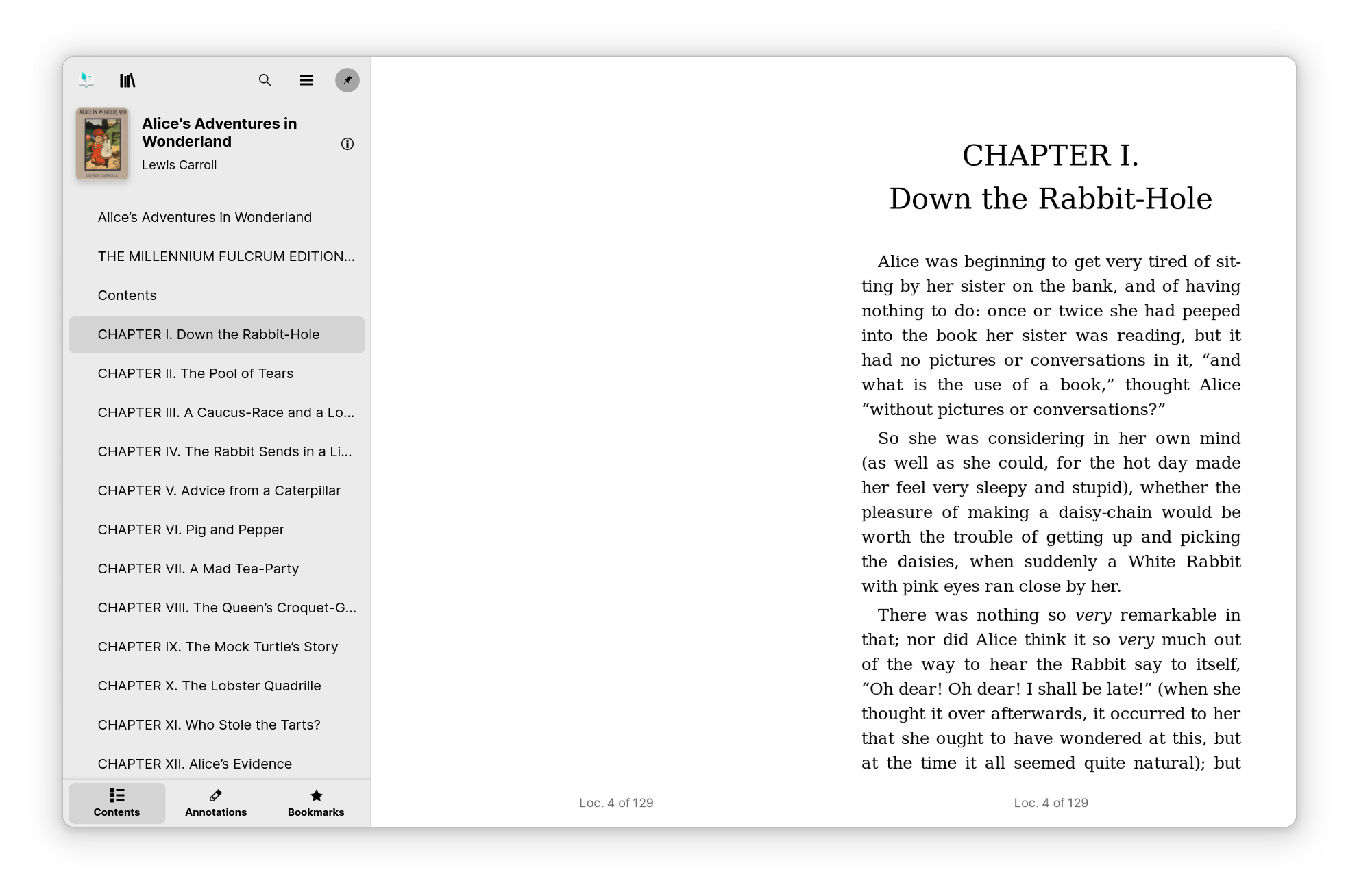
- Foliate 3.1.1, displaying the book Alice's Adventures in Wonderland by Lewis Carroll
- Initial release: 26 May 2019; 6 years ago
- Stable release: 3.3.0 / 1 April 2025; 11 months ago
- Written in: JavaScript
- Operating system: Linux
- Available in: 12 languages
- List of languages Chinese, Czech, Dutch, French, German, Indonesian, Italian, Portuguese, Putonghua, Russian, Spanish, Swedish
- Type: E-book reader
- License: GPLv3 or later (Free Software)
- Website: johnfactotum.github.io/foliate/
- Repository: github.com/johnfactotum/foliate

Foliate is a free and open-source program for reading e-books in Linux. In English, foliate is an adjective meaning to be shaped like a leaf, from the Latin foliatus, meaning leafy.

== Features ==
Foliate focuses on reading and supports book management with a dedicated library view. It supports typical e-book formats with reflowable text: EPUB (primary focus), Mobipocket, AZW(3), and no formats with fixed layout, although PDF support is also available.

Its customizable and theme-based user interface is inspired by those of portable e-reader hardware devices. It follows the GNOME standards and automatically adapts to different screen formats. It is streamlined for distraction-free reading and is described as pleasant and more polished than other free desktop applications. Books are displayed in a paginated view, with double-page or single-page view depending on screen size, or in a continuous scrolling view, with customizable typeface, spacing/margins, brightness and size/zoom. Control elements hide with an automatic fading effect while basic navigation with hidden controls is still possible by clicking/tapping on pages or arrow keys. It has a toggleable navigation sidebar, can display a reading time estimate with a progress slider with chapter markers and supports multi-touch gestures such as pinch zoom. A full-screen mode can be activated.

Foliate can browse the OPDS feed of Project Gutenberg, Standard Ebooks and Feedbooks, and can automatically download royalty free ebooks from these sources. It is also possible to manually add other OPDS sources.

Foliate supports speech synthesis using eSpeak, eSpeakNG or Festival, albeit without automatic detection of the content language. It is also possible to use Google's text to speech service in Foliate. A full-text search is available (also for annotations), as well as word lookup (in Wikipedia and Wiktionary or offline dictionaries via a dictd interface) and integration of Google Translate.

The application stores reading progress, bookmarks and annotations in a central directory using one JSON file per book. These can be synchronized with other devices, although it uses a format that does not work immediately with other reading software. It can also check for spelling errors in annotations and export them as Markdown. It is not able to synchronize e-books with a hardware reader device.

== Technology ==
The application is written in JavaScript, based on the JavaScript interpreter GJS, the epub.js library, the rendering engine WebKit and GTK 4 (previously GTK 3) for the user interface. Optionally gspell can be used for spell checking of annotations. Support for the Kindle formats (mobi, azwX) was based on a Python module until version 3.0.0.

Version 3.0.0 added GTK 4 and LibAdwaita support. Released in November 2023, it is a full rewrite of the app. It now has its own e-book parser and renderer.

== Distribution ==
Foliate is published as Free Software, and therefore with its complete source code, under the terms of the GNU General Public License version 3 or later. It was first published on 26 May 2019 on GitHub. Binary files are distributed primarily as Flatpak packages via Flathub. These can be installed on several major Linux distributions using on-board tools. It has been included in the default package repositories of several distributions, including Fedora, Arch and OpenSUSE. Additionally, there are Snap packages available through the snap store and a .deb file for Debian-based distributions which can also be installed and updated via a Personal Package Archive under Ubuntu and its siblings. It can be also installed in an Android phone using Termux and VNC. Foliate can be installed on Windows with WSL. While Foliate cannot be installed on Windows, MacOS and Android as a native app, Readest, a modern rewrite of Foliate, is available as a cross platform ebook reader application in all these platforms, as well as Linux.

== See also ==
- Sumatra PDF, a free and open-source e-book reading application for Windows
- List of PDF software

== Sources ==
- Das, Ankush (2020-04-13). "Foliate: A Modern eBook Reader App for Linux". It's FOSS.
- Langner, Christoph (December 2019). "Tutorial – Foliate". Linux Magazine.
- Sneddon, Joey (2019-05-30). "Foliate is an Epic eBook Reader for Linux Desktops (Updated)". OMG! Ubuntu!.
