= Sumatra PDF =

Free and open-source document viewer for Windows

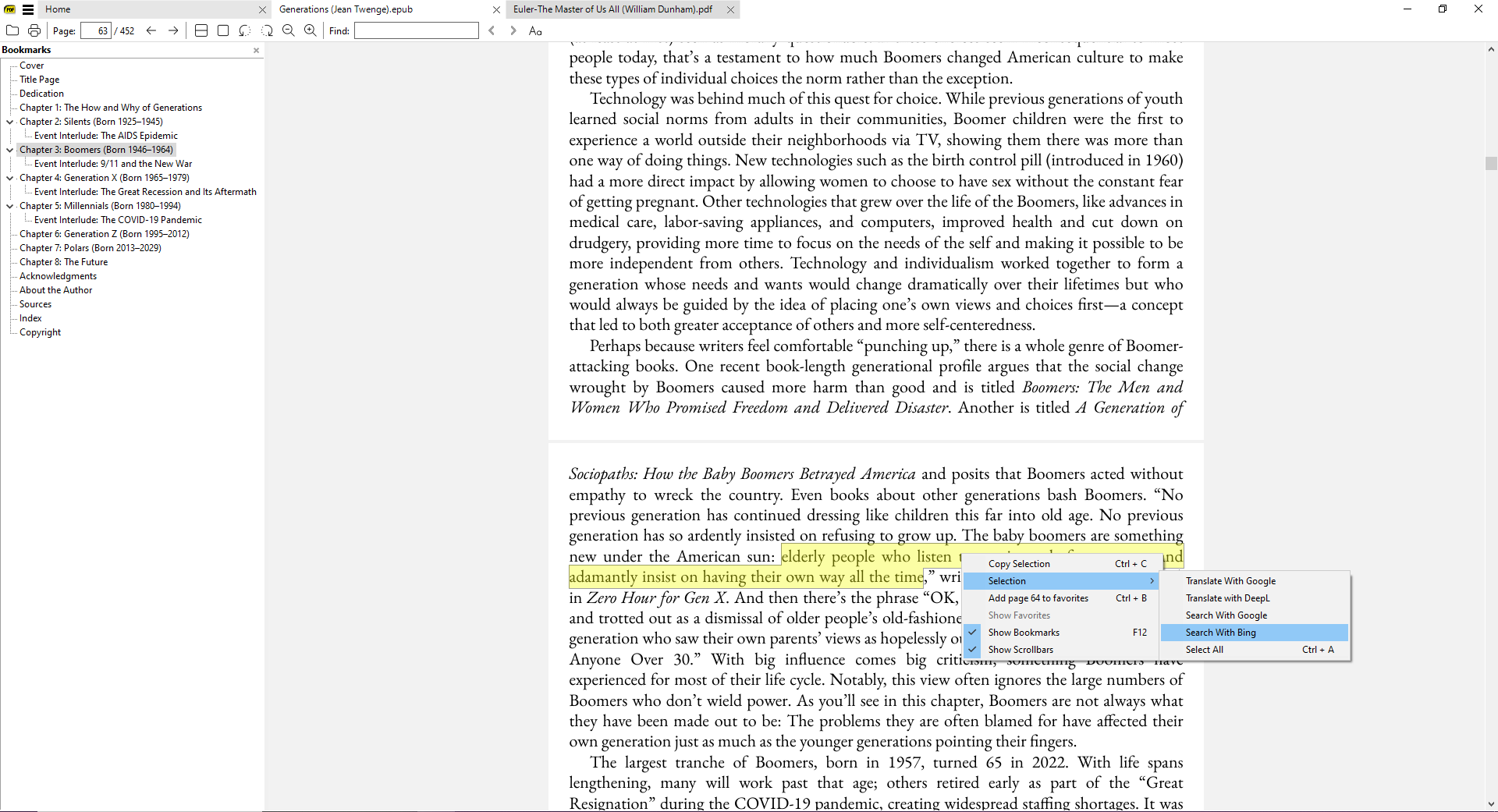
- Sumatra PDF 3.5.2 (64-bit) on Windows 10
- Original author: Krzysztof Kowalczyk
- Developers: Krzysztof Kowalczyk, Simon Bünzli, and others
- Release: 1 June 2006; 20 years ago
- Stable release: 3.6.1 / 6 April 2026; 4 months ago
- Preview release: 3.7.21978 / 2 September 2026; 1 day ago
- Written in: C, C++
- Operating system: Windows Vista and newer
- Size: 9.69 MB (32-bit); 10.5 MB (64-bit); 9.87 MB (ARM64)
- Available in: Multilingual
- Type: Document viewer
- License: GNU General Public License v3
- Website: sumatrapdfreader.org
- Repository: github.com/sumatrapdfreader/sumatrapdf

Sumatra PDF is a free and open-source document viewer that supports many document formats including: Portable Document Format (PDF), Microsoft Compiled HTML Help (CHM), DjVu, EPUB, FictionBook (FB2), MOBI, PRC, Open XML Paper Specification (OpenXPS, OXPS, XPS), and Comic Book Archive file (CB7, CBR, CBT, CBZ). If Ghostscript is installed, it supports PostScript files. It is developed exclusively for Microsoft Windows.

== Features ==
Sumatra has a minimalist design, with its simplicity attained at the cost of extensive features. For rendering PDFs, it uses the MuPDF library.

Sumatra was designed for portable use, as it consists of one file with no external dependencies, making it usable from an external USB drive, needing no installation. This classifies it as a portable application to read PDF, XPS, DjVu, CHM, eBooks (ePub, FictionBook, Mobi PDB and TCR), Comic Book (CBZ, CBR, CBT, and CB7) and image formats (BMP, GIF, JPEG, JPEG 2000, JPEG XR, PNG, TGA, and WebP). Sumatra can also support PostScript, PJL, and HEIF formats via external software.

As is characteristic of many portable applications, Sumatra uses little disk space. In 2009, Sumatra 1.0 had a 1.21 MB setup file, compared to Adobe Reader 9.5's 32 MB. In January, 2017, the latest version of SumatraPDF, 3.1.2, had a single 6.1 Mb executable file; in comparison, Adobe Reader XI used 320 MB of disk space.

The PDF format's use restrictions were implemented in Sumatra 0.6, preventing users from printing or copying from documents that the document author restricts, a form of digital rights management. Kowalczyk stated, "I decided that [Sumatra] will honor PDF creator's wishes." Other open-source readers like Okular and Evince make this optional, and Debian patches software to remove these restrictions, in accord with its principles of interoperability and re-use.

Through version 1.1, printing was achieved by rasterizing each PDF page to a bitmap. This resulted in very large spool files and slow printing.

Since version 0.9.1, hyperlinks embedded in PDF documents have been supported.

Sumatra is multilingual, with 69 community-contributed translations.

Sumatra supports SyncTeX, a bidirectional method to synchronize TeX source and PDF output produced by pdfTeX or XeTeX.

== Development ==
Sumatra PDF is written mainly by two contributors: Krzysztof Kowalczyk and Simon Bünzli. The source code is developed in two programming languages, mostly in C, with some components in C++. The source code is provided with support for Microsoft Visual Studio.

As it was first designed when Windows XP was the current version of Windows, Sumatra initially had some incompatibilities with earlier versions of Windows. Support for Windows 95, 98 and ME has since been removed.

Initially, Kowalczyk did not release a 64-bit version of Sumatra, indicating that while it might offer slightly more speed and available memory, he believed at that time that it would greatly add to user confusion and that the benefits would not outweigh the potential costs. However, some users requested 64-bit builds of Sumatra and other developers had compiled unofficial 64-bit builds which loaded documents faster than the 32-bit builds. However, the official builds' developer had requested that unofficial builds not bear the 'Sumatra' name. In October 2015, an official 64-bit version of Sumatra was released. In April 2023, an official ARM64 version of Sumatra was released.

The Sumatra source code was originally hosted on Google Code. Due to US export legal restrictions, it was unavailable "in countries on the United States Office of Foreign Assets Control sanction list, including Cuba, Iran, North Korea, Sudan and Syria." The source code is currently hosted on GitHub.

== History ==
The first version of Sumatra PDF, designated version 0.1, was based on Xpdf 0.2 and was released on 1 June 2006. It switched to Poppler from version 0.2. In version 0.4, it changed to MuPDF for more speed and better support for the Windows platform. Poppler remained as alternative engine for a time, and from version 0.6 to 0.8 it was automatically used to render pages that MuPDF failed to load. Poppler was removed in version 0.9, released on 10 August 2008.

In July 2009, Sumatra PDF changed its license from GNU GPLv2 to GNU GPLv3 to match the same license change on MuPDF.

Since version 0.9.4, Sumatra supports the JPEG 2000 format.

Version 1.0 was released on 17 November 2009, after more than three years of cumulative development. Version 2.0 was released on 2 April 2012, over two years after the release of version 1.0.

In 2007, the first unofficial translations were released by Lars Wohlfahrt before Sumatra PDF got official multi-language support.

In October 2015, version 3.1 introduced a 64-bit version, in addition to their original 32-bit version.

In April 2023, version 3.5 introduced an ARM64 version, in addition to the 64-bit and original 32-bit version.

== Name and artwork ==
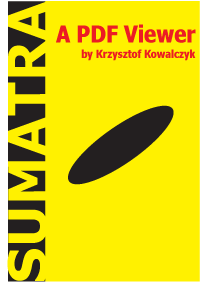
Early Logo of Sumatra PDF, inspired by the Watchmen comic.

The author has indicated that the choice of the name "Sumatra" is not a tribute to the Island of Sumatra or coffee, stating that there is no particular reasoning behind the name.

The graphics design of Sumatra is a tribute to the cover of the Watchmen graphic novel by Alan Moore and Dave Gibbons.

== Critical reception ==
Sumatra has attracted acclaim for its speed and simplicity, for being portable, its keyboard shortcuts, and its open-source development.

At one time the Free Software Foundation Europe recommended Sumatra PDF, but then removed its recommendation in February 2014, due to the presence of the non-freely licensed unrar code in Sumatra. As foundation representative Heiki Ojasild explained, "while they continue to make use of the non-free library, SumatraPDF cannot be recognised as Free Software." Unrar was eventually replaced with a free alternative in version 3.0, making it 100% free software.

== See also ==
- Foliate, a free and open-source e-book reading application for Linux
- List of PDF software
- List of portable software
