= PDF-XChange Viewer =

PDF viewer software

- Developer: Tracker Software
- Initial release: June 21, 2007; 18 years ago
- Stable release: 2.5.322.10 / December 13, 2018; 7 years ago
- Operating system: Windows XP or later
- Successor: PDF-XChange Editor
- Size: 17 MB
- Available in: 30 languages
- Type: PDF viewer
- License: Freemium
- Website: www.pdf-xchange.com/product/pdf-xchange-viewer

PDF-XChange Viewer is a discontinued freemium PDF reader for Microsoft Windows by Tracker Software, a subsidiary of UK-based software company PDF-XChange Co. Ltd. It supports saving PDF forms (AcroForms) and importing or exporting form data in FDF/XFDF format. Since version 2.5, there has been partial support for XFA, and exporting form data in XML Data Package (XDP) or XML format. OCR support was also added in version 2.5.

Through its print driver, PDF files are able to be created from any Windows app that supports printing.

The viewer component of PXF-XChange is compatible with Wine, which provides another way to annotate PDFs on Linux.

From 2001 to 2021, Tracker Software had also licensed commercial SDKs for working with TIFF and PDF formats, but these were discontinued so the company could focus on their primary revenue stream, sales of end-user applications.

The PDF-XChange Viewer product was superseded by PDF-XChange Editor in 2018; old versions may still be downloaded from the vendor's web site.

== See also ==
- List of PDF software
