= PDFedit =

Free PDF editor for Unix systems

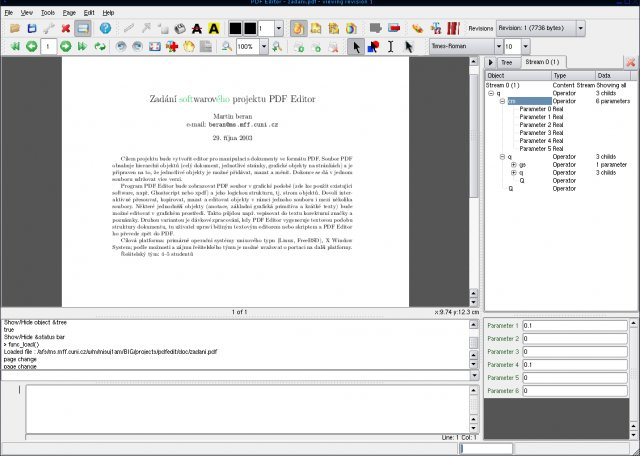
- PDF editor
- Developers: Michal Hocko, Jozef Mišutka, Martin Petříček, Miroslav Jahoda
- Final release: 0.4.5 / February 10, 2012; 14 years ago
- Operating system: Unix-like, Windows
- Available in: English, Czech, German, Russian, Spanish
- Type: PDF editor
- License: GNU General Public License
- Website: pdfedit.cz
- Repository: sf.net/p/pdfedit/git/

PDFedit is a free PDF editor for Unix-like operating systems (including Cygwin on top of Windows). It does not support editing protected or encrypted PDF files or word processor-style text manipulation, however.

PDFedit GUI is based on the Qt 3 toolkit and scripting engine (QSA), so every operation is scriptable. It also has the ability to be scripted in ECMAScript. Part of the program is also command line interface for PDF manipulation. Xpdf is used for low level processing.

PDF is a complex format designed for publishing output, not for any further modifications. PDFedit is a low-level tool for technical users that provides structured access to the internal structure of the PDF file. It may require familiarity with PDF specifications to be able to make substantial modifications.

== See also ==
- List of PDF software
