= PDFgear =

PDF software

- Developer: PDF Gear Tech Pte. Ltd.
- Initial release: 2022; 4 years ago
- Operating system: Microsoft Windows, macOS, iOS, iPadOS, Android
- Available in: Multilingual (11 languages)
- Type: PDF software
- License: Proprietary
- Website: www.pdfgear.com

PDFgear is a freeware proprietary PDF management application that can view, edit, fill, sign, and convert PDF files. It is developed by PDF Gear Tech Pte. Ltd. and was first released in 2022. PDFgear supports multiple platforms, including Microsoft Windows, macOS, iOS, iPadOS, and Android. PDFgear provides tools for viewing, editing, converting, and signing PDF documents.

PDFgear is mainly known for being totally free, and has been described as an alternative to paid software such as Adobe Acrobat. However, PDFgear does not fully replace Adobe Acrobat for advanced or enterprise-level use since it lacks several advanced features, such as Professional-grade editing and collaboration features.

== Reception ==
PDFgear has received generally positive reviews from technology publications, which highlight its comprehensive free feature set.

PCMag called it "by far the best free PDF editor we’ve tried," while Digital Trends described the software as "excellent" and a "holy grail" for a free, offline PDF editor. TechRadar similarly noted its appeal as a free model without watermarks or mandatory accounts.

Regarding security, a Digital Trends review addressed initial skepticism. It noted that despite assumptions of risk, no antivirus warnings appeared, and praised the ability to edit "private work documents" offline without uploading to external servers. PCWorld positioned PDFgear as a secure alternative to "clunky" online tools with "questionable security", highlighting that PDFgear's e-signature function "secures your data with military-grade encryption."

Some criticism focused on usability and feature limitations compared to other paid PDF editors. PCMag found PDFgear "isn’t nearly as easy to use as the paid apps and makes it difficult or impossible to perform some editing tasks, but it’s better than nothing." PCWorld also noted the lack of direct integration with cloud storage services.
