= Global Graphics =

Software companies of the United Kingdom

Global Graphics SA
- Company type: Public
- Traded as: Euronext: GLOG
- Industry: Software
- Founded: Nancy (1996)
- Headquarters: Cambourne, Cambridgeshire, UK
- Website: Global Graphics

Global Graphics PLC was a software company known for its digital printing and document technology including the Harlequin and Jaws RIPs and the gDoc digital document software. The company supplied its software under license to Original Equipment Manufacturers and software vendors who build products around it. Today that software is primarily used in the Digital Front Ends of new generation digital and inkjet production presses and in desktop and mobile productivity software products. The company has a large share of the photobook and newspaper markets. It is listed on the Euronext stock exchange in Brussels under the symbol GLOG.

== History ==
Global Graphics was incorporated in 1996 in Nancy, France in connection with the acquisition of the Photomeca group of companies and at the time was primarily a pre-press hardware business. However, in 1999 Global Graphics expanded into the printing software market with the acquisition of the Harlequin Group and in 2000 of 5D Solutions through which it acquired the Jaws RIP and Jaws PDF® range of technologies. In 2002 it divested itself of its hardware businesses altogether, emerging as a software only company.

As a result of the Company’s expertise in Page Description Languages such as PostScript and PDF, in 2003 Global Graphics was chosen by Microsoft to provide consultancy and proof of concept development services on XPS, Microsoft’s new print and document format, and worked with the Windows development teams on the specification for the new format. XPS remains the format for Windows operating systems going forward.
In 2009, Global Graphics introduced the gDoc brand as the successor to the Jaws PDF range, initially as stand-alone productivity applications, such as gDoc Fusion and gDoc Creator. In 2015 these were spun off onto a separate web site, gDoc Inspired, to showcase examples of software applications that can be built on the gDoc Application Platform and the gDoc Printer Platform.

In 2015 Global Graphics purchased its long-standing customer RTI, located in Sarasota, Florida, USA. RTI provides and supports custom-branded versions of the Harlequin RIP direct to print service providers and printing equipment manufacturers, mostly in the North American market. RTI has grown its on-line sales operation over the past 20 years. In September 2015 Global Graphics acquired font manufacturer URW++ Design & Development GmbH, located in Hamburg, Germany. URW++ Design & Development GmbH invented digital outline font technology and tools 35 years ago and is one of the few remaining font foundries that date from the pre-PostScript era. In addition to licensing their extensive type libraries to the graphic design market they develop exclusive corporate typefaces, counting brands such as General Motors, Mercedes Benz and Siemens among their customer base.

In December 2016, Global Graphics acquired TTP Meteor Limited, specialists in printhead driver systems, from the TTP Group plc based near Cambridge, UK.

In December 2017, Global Graphics expanded its relationship with HP Indigo to include HP Indigo's range of label and packaging presses.

Global Graphics has main offices in Cambourne, UK; Acton MA, USA; and Tokyo, Japan.

In May 2018, Global Graphics Software introduced Mako, software development kit (SDK) for preparing documents for print and designed to give complete control over pre-press files.

In November 2019 Global Graphics PLC acquired Xitron, LLC (“Xitron”), a company headquartered in Ann Arbor, Michigan, USA. Xitron develops workflow systems and interfaces to drive prepress output devices.

In 2020, Global Graphics PLC acquired Hybrid Software. Global Graphics PLC subsequently changed its name to Hybrid Software Group PLC, with Global Graphics Software, Hybrid Software, Meteor Inkjet and Xitron being subsidiaries within the Group.

In October 2021, Hybrid Software Group acquired ColorLogic GmbH

In 2025, Global Graphics Software, a subsidiary of Hybrid Software Group, changed its name to Hybrid Software Helix.
