= Bullzip PDF Printer =

Danish freeware PDF printer

Bullzip PDF printer
- Developer: Bullzip
- Stable release: 2026.1.0.3002 / September 1, 2026; 4 days ago
- Operating system: Windows only
- Type: PDF creator
- License: Proprietary Freeware
- Website: www.bullzip.com/products/pdf/info.php

Bullzip PDF printer is free-of-charge virtual printer computer software that allows programs running under Microsoft Windows operating systems to create Portable Document Format (PDF) files by selecting to "print" to the Bullzip PDF printer instead of a physical printer. Version 12.x of the software was approved for use by the US Department of Veterans Affairs, with AES encryption listed as a benefit, subject to some decision constraints such as keeping up-to-date, and banning the use of FTP, unapproved by the VA.

== Features ==
The Bullzip PDF Printer works by creating a virtual printer in the operating systems that prints to PDF files instead of paper. This practically allows any application to create PDF files from the print menu. The virtual printer employs Ghostscript in order to translate the document into the Portable Document Format, and requires Ghostscript 9.0 or later. It can be viewed as a printer option in your printing properties once installed.

Bullzip is free for personal or commercial use by not more than ten users. There is also a commercial version called bioPDF.

A review in 2020 reported that the virtual printer had the features of most such programs, with additional security features, including password-protecting PDF files during creation with 128/40 encryption, and watermarking. It stated that PDF files created were not searchable, tended to be larger than produced by other programs, and that conversion was rather slow. It is not limited to PDF, also producing BMP, JPEG, PCX, PNG, and TIFF files. It offers quality settings for screen, printer, ebook, and prepress. An unusual feature is the ability to append content to an existing PDF file.

== PDF Studio ==
Bullzip also publish free software "PDF Studio" which can view PDFs and merge, search, print, split, delete, and move pages.

== See also ==
- List of PDF software
