= PDFtk =

Software for manipulating PDF documents

- Developer: Sid Steward
- Initial release: July 14, 2004
- Stable release: 2.02 / July 24, 2013; 12 years ago
- Written in: C++
- Operating system: Cross-platform
- Type: PDF utility
- License: Proprietary / GPL
- Website: www.pdflabs.com/tools/pdftk-the-pdf-toolkit/

PDFtk (short for PDF Toolkit) is a toolkit for manipulating Portable Document Format (PDF) documents. It runs on Linux, Windows and macOS. It comes in three versions: PDFtk Server (open-source command-line tool), PDFtk Free (freeware) and PDFtk Pro (proprietary paid). It is able to concatenate, shuffle, split and rotate PDF files. It can also show and update metadata. Both CLI and GUI versions of PDFtk are available.

== Java implementation ==
pdftk-java is a port of PDFtk into Java which is developed by Marc Vinyals and GPL licensed. The initial release was on December 30, 2017.

== See also ==
- List of PDF software
