= Javelin PDF Reader =

PDF Reader Application

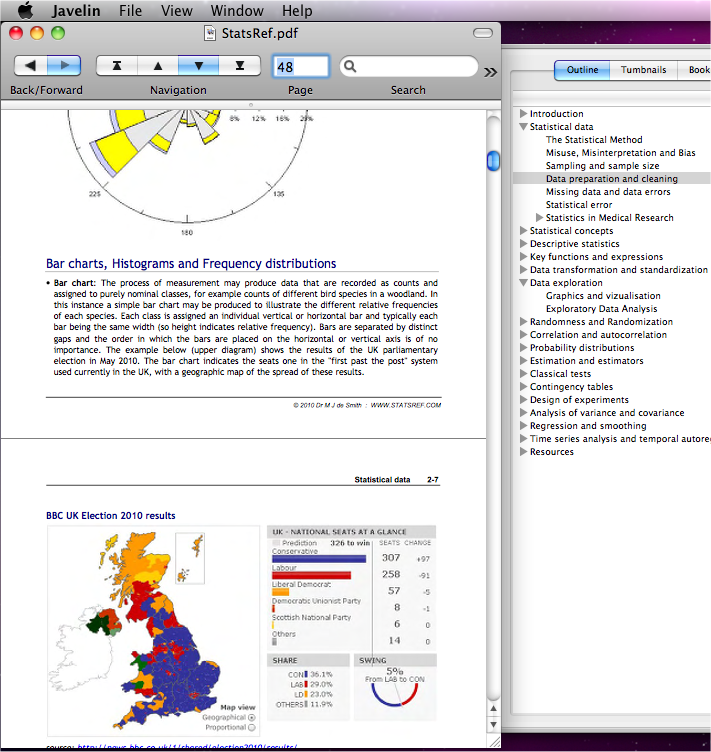
- Developer: Drumlin Security Ltd
- Operating system: Windows 7 and later, macOS, iOS/iPadOS, Android
- Type: PDF software
- License: Freeware
- Website: www.drumlinsecurity.com

Javelin PDF Reader is a full functionality secure PDF reader for Windows, macOS, iOS/iPadOS (iPad and iPhone) and Android, with support for Digital Rights Management (DRM) using encoded and encrypted PDF files in Drumlin's DRMX and DRMZ formats.

== Overview ==
PDF files that have been converted to the DRMX and DRMZ formats (using the free DrumlinPublisher software) can be protected against printing, or printing can be permitted with limits to the number times printed/pages printed, copying is disabled, date expiry of PDF files is provided (in two ways), limits on the number of times a file can be viewed is available, optional intelligent (dynamic) watermarking is provided, and usage of the files is tracked centrally.

All versions of Javelin support downloadable catalogs - a form of folder structure allowing metadata, covers and other data to be downloaded and stored locally within the apps for fast access to large number of PDF or secured PDF documents.

== Features ==
- Viewing and printing of standard PDF files
- Markup and annotation of PDF and secure PDF documents
- Viewing and printing of secured PDF files with DRM protection
- Page insertion, deletion and extraction (Javelin3 for Windows, latest versions)

== Requirements ==
As of 2026 the developer lists Javelin3 for Windows 8, 10 and 11 (version 3.1.0.48), macOS 10.13 and later (version 3.06.00), Android 7 and later (version 3.00.98) and iOS/iPadOS 9 and later (version 3.01.07). Readers for older versions of these operating systems are available on request.

== See also ==
- List of PDF software
