= PDFsharp =

.NET library for processing PDF files

- Developer: empira Software GmbH
- Stable release: 6.5.0 / May 19, 2025; 17 months ago
- Written in: C#
- Operating system: Cross-platform
- Type: Portable Document Format (PDF), Library
- License: GNU Affero General Public Licence version 3 or Commercial licence
- Website: http://docs.pdfsharp.net
- Repository: github.com/empira/PDFsharp

PDFsharp is an open source .NET library for processing PDF files. It is written in C#. The library can be used to create, render, print, split, merge, modify, and extract text and meta-data of PDF files.

Features include images with transparency (color mask, monochrome mask, alpha mask), font embedding and subsetting, and graphical implementation based either on GDI+ or WPF.

== See also ==
- List of PDF software
