= PDF Studio =

Commercial desktop application for PDF documents

- Developer: Qoppa Software
- Final release: 2024.0.0 / 18 April 2024; 2 years ago
- Operating system: Windows, macOS, Linux, IBM AIX, Solaris
- Available in: 6 languages
- List of languages English, French, German, Spanish, Italian, Japanese
- Type: PDF editor
- License: Proprietary license
- Website: qoppa.com/pdfstudioviewer/

PDF Studio is a discontinued commercial desktop application from Qoppa Software to create, convert, review, annotate, and edit Portable Document Format (PDF) documents.

== Maintenance status ==
Qoppa Software was acquired by Apryse Software in August 2023. Following the acquisition, the company published one final version, PDF Studio 2024.

Qoppa PDF Studio is now discontinued, after the final version reached the end of its two-year support period in April 2026.

Apryse continues to develop Xodo PDF Studio, a PDF editing suite with desktop and web versions.

== System requirements ==
PDF Studio runs on Windows, Mac, Linux, Unix

- Windows: Windows 11, Windows 10, Windows 8 & 8.1, Windows 7, Windows Server
- Mac: macOS 14 (Sonoma), macOS 13 (Ventura), macOS 12 (Monterey), macOS 11.1 (Big Sur), macOS 10.15 (Catalina), macOS 10.14 (Mojave), macOS 10.13 High Sierra
- Linux: Most Linux distributions including Arch, Debian, Fedora, Mint, Red Hat, Suse, Ubuntu
- Unix: Most Unix flavors including Raspbian (Raspberry Pi), AIX, Solaris Intel, Solaris Sparc, HP-UX
- Processor: 2.5 GHz or faster processor
- RAM: 1024 MB system memory
- Display: 1024x768 screen resolution
- Hard Disk Space: 300 MB of available hard disk space

== See also ==
- List of PDF software
