= PDFescape =

PDF editor program

- Developer: Red Software
- Operating system: Cross-platform, Any with a web browser (Web-based application)
- Type: PDF Software
- License: N/A
- Website: pdfescape.com

PDFescape is an advertising- and fee-supported PDF editor program written in JavaScript, HTML, CSS and ASP. It has an online and Windows version. It features PDF editing, form filling, page arrangement, printing, saving, and form publishing. A premium ad free version is available for a fee. Form publishing requires additional fees.

PDFescape offers online storage of PDF documents. PDFescape can be used with common browsers such as Firefox, Internet Explorer, Safari, Chrome, and Opera.

The first release was published on February 20, 2007.

PDFescape has been reviewed by websites Cnet and Lifehacker, PCWorld, and TechRadar.

== Features ==
Logo when PDFescape was in beta

PDF documents can be opened within the application itself or imported through the web interface. Open documents can be modified using a set of tools similar, but more limited, than those found in PDF applications such as Adobe Acrobat.

== See also ==
- Online office suite
- List of PDF software
