= XPS Annotator =

- Developer: Danang Probo Sayekti
- Initial release: 12 March 2009
- Stable release: 1.23 / 9 March 2024; 2 years ago
- Written in: C# (Microsoft Visual Studio Express) and XAML
- Operating system: Windows XP with Service Pack 2, Windows Server 2003 with Service Pack 1 or any later operating system
- Platform: Microsoft Windows / .NET Framework
- Available in: English
- Type: Document Management, File viewer
- License: Proprietary – Freeware / Donationware
- Website: xpsdev.com

XPS Annotator is a document management software program for Microsoft Windows that allows users to view, annotate, convert, sign and print XPS documents. The software was first released on 12 March 2009 (version 1.0). It was created by Danang Probo Sayekti of Magelang, Indonesia.

== Features ==
=== Installation ===
Before version 1.2, the XPS annotator was installed using the Windows Installer, and from version 1.20 until the present version (version 1.22) it is installed using Inno Setup. The .exe files generated by the Inno Setup are compressed into ZIP format. There are two kinds of files contained in the zip file, the readme.html and the installer files in the form of .exe files.

=== Annotating XPSs ===
Like PDF documents, Open XML Paper Specification (XPS) documents support the annotation feature, however, the annotations features in XPS documents are still limited. XPS Annotator has the ability to add annotations to these XPS documents. These annotations can include many types of content such as typed text, handwritten notes, or Web links.

There are three options users can add: highlight annotations, text annotations and ink annotations.

- Highlight annotations: allows user to highlight lines of text or paragraphs.
- Text annotations and ink annotations: user can add text notes or ink notes.

=== Signing XPSs ===
XPS Annotator also support digital signatures. User can digitally sign or encrypt the XPS document for security or authentication, and the supported security certificate is X.509.

=== Converting XPSs ===
XPS Annotator the capability to convert XPS documents to image files. XPS Annotator currently supports conversion of XPS documents into several popular image formats including PNG, JPEG, BMP, GIF and TIFF.

=== Other features ===
- Ability to print document with annotations.
- Capability to add document properties.
- Hyperlink support.
- Supports general operations such as print, save, zoom, text search, copy and paste.

=== Critical reception ===
- CNET editors give the XPS Annotator a favorable rating.

== See also ==
- Annotations
- Electronic document
- Open XML Paper Specification
