= Solid PDF Creator =

- Developer: Solid Documents
- Release: 2006; 20 years ago
- Stable release: 9.0 (Windows) / June 18, 2014; 12 years ago
- Size: 10.1 MB (Windows)
- Available in: Multilingual
- Type: PDF Creator
- License: Proprietary commercial software
- Website: www.soliddocuments.com

Solid PDF Creator is proprietary document processing software which converts virtually any Windows-based document into a PDF. Suitable for home and office use, the program appears as a printer option in the Print menu of any print-capable Windows application. The same technology used in the software's Solid Framework SDK is licensed by Adobe for Acrobat X

== History ==
Solid Documents, the makers of Solid PDF Creator, launched the product in 2006 and have released several version updates since then including 2.0 in 2007. The latest product enhancement, new to version 7, allows for the conversion of Windows-based documents into PDF/A documents in compliance with ISO 19005-1 standards for long-term preservation and archival purposes. Version 9.0, released in June 2014, sees conversion and table reconstruction improvements, less XML output, and feature integration.

== Features ==
Solid PDF Creator supports conversion from the following formats into PDF:

- Microsoft Word .docx and .doc
- Rich text format .rtf
- Microsoft Excel .xlsx
- .xml
- Microsoft PowerPoint .pptx
- .html
- Plain text .txt

Solid PDF Creator provides a variety of file conversion options including password protection, encryption, permission definition, ISO 19005-1 archiving standards, and file compression capabilities.

Building upon the features offered in Solid PDF Creator, Solid PDF Creator Plus released in 2008 allows users to manipulate watermarks, rearrange pages, extract pages, and drag and drop content.

== See also ==
- List of PDF software
