= Soda PDF =

Application used to view and edit PDF files

- Developer: LULU Software Limited
- Initial release: 2010
- Stable release: 14 / 12 May 2022; 4 years ago
- Operating system: Microsoft Windows
- Available in: 8 languages
- List of languages English, French, Italian, German, Spanish, Portuguese, Russian and Japanese
- Type: PDF Software
- License: End-user license agreement
- Website: www.sodapdf.com

Soda PDF is an application used to view, create, and edit Portable Document Format (PDF) files. The software was developed by LULU Software in 2010, based in Montreal, Quebec, Canada.

== Features ==
Some of the main features are:

- Merge/append Files. Merge or combine files / add pages to a document.
- Electronic signature. Digitally sign online documents.
- Rearrange Pages. Rearrange/reorder pages within a document.
- Delete pages.
- Rotate pages.
- Access controls/permissions.
- Commenting/notes.
- Cloud storage integration

Other Soda PDF features are based on older versions such as Soda PDF 2012 and Soda PDF 5. The software also has the ability to read comic book files such as CBR and CBZ, and eBook files such as EPUB.

== Soda View / 3D and Create ==
Soda View/3D is a free PDF application users can use to open, view, and create PDF files. The flipping animation tool of its patent-pending 3D feature enables users to go through pages of PDF files. CNET has praised the 3D Reader as being “clean and inviting,” However, the program also installs unwanted software that creates frequent pop-ups in Windows.

== Version history ==
Version	Date	Description
Soda PDF Professional 2011 with OCR	May 2011	New features include Create & Convert, Edit & Insert, Secure & Sign, Digital Signature, Secure Permissions, Password Security features, and OCR.
Soda PDF 2012	December 2011	3D View, split PDF into multiple files, extract specific pages of a PDF document, easier to select text, make necessary modifications and rearrange elements within PDF documents.
Soda PDF 5	October 2012	Interface redesigned, improved layer management and form creation, additional tools for reviewing and annotating documents, support for TIFF file format for PDF creation.
Soda PDF 6	November 2013	Modular feature installation
Soda PDF 12	August 2020	User interface refresh; increased speed; E-sign
Soda PDF 14	May 2022	
