= Evince =

Free and open-source document viewer

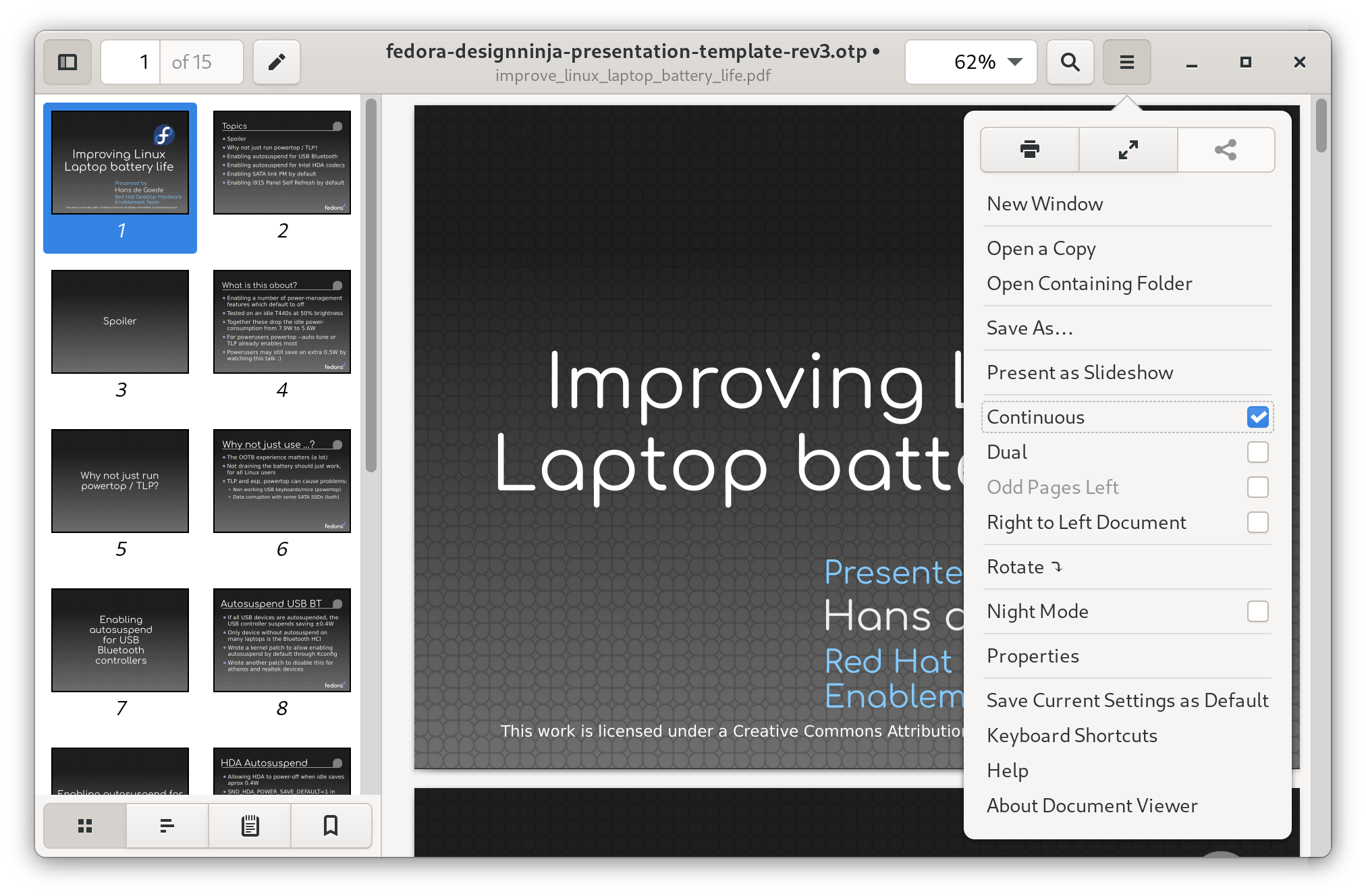
- GNOME Evince 40 (released in March 2021)
- Other names: GNOME Document Viewer
- Developer: The Evince Team
- Stable release: 48.4 / 19 May 2026; 3 months ago
- Written in: Primarily C, C++
- Operating system: Linux and other Unix-like systems
- Successor: GNOME Papers
- Type: Document viewer
- License: GPL-2.0-or-later
- Website: wiki.gnome.org/Apps/Evince
- Repository: gitlab.gnome.org/GNOME/evince.git

Evince (/ˈɛvɪns/), also known as GNOME Document Viewer, is a free and open-source document viewer supporting many document file formats including PDF, PostScript, DjVu, TIFF, XPS and DVI. It is designed for the GNOME desktop environment.

The developers of Evince intended to replace the multiple GNOME document viewers with a single and simple application. The Evince motto sums up the project aim: "Simply a Document Viewer".

GNOME releases have included Evince since GNOME 2.12 (September 2005). Evince's code is written mainly in C, with a small part (specifically, the interface with Poppler) written in C++. Many Linux distributions that ship GNOME as their default desktop environment — including Ubuntu and Fedora Linux — include or have included Evince as the default document viewer.

Evince is free and open-source software subject to the requirements of the GNU General Public License version 2 or later.

The Evince FAQ highlights the meaning of the word "Evince" as "to show or express something clearly".

In 2025, Evince was replaced as the default document viewer in GNOME by a GTK 4 & Libadwaita hard fork of itself called Papers.

== History ==
Evince began as a rewrite of GPdf, which its support programmers had started to find unwieldy to maintain. Evince quickly surpassed the functionality of GPdf and replaced both GPdf and GGV in the September 2005 release of GNOME 2.12.

There was at one time a Windows version of Evince and it was then included on the VALO-CD, a collection of "Best of Free and Open Source Software for Windows".

Ubuntu 25.04 (with their release of GNOME 48) was the first distro to replace Evince with a GTK 4 & Libadwaita hard fork of itself called Papers. In GNOME 49, Evince will be replaced as the default document viewer by upstream GNOME developers by Papers. Joey Sneddon of OMG! Ubuntu suggested that the reason that the GNOME developers made a new document viewer application was that it would take a lot of work for Evince, a 20 year old program at the time of the decision, to be ported over to GTK 4 & Libadwaita, hence why a new application hard forked from Evince's codebase was made rather than continuing to rework Evince proper was made. This was similar to why Gedit, Eye of GNOME, and Cheese were replaced by GNOME Text Editor, Loupe, and Snapshot respectively rather than port the existing applications over to GTK 4 and Libadwaita.

== Features ==
Evince incorporates an integrated search that displays the number of results found and highlights the results on the page. Users can optionally display (in the left sidebar of the viewer) thumbnails of pages to assist in page navigation within a document. When documents support indices, Evince gives the option of showing the document index for quickly moving from one section to another.

Evince can show two pages at a time, left and right, and offers full-screen and slide-show views.

Evince allows the selection of text in PDF files and allows users to highlight and copy text from documents made from scanned images, if the PDF includes OCR data.

Evince used to obey the DRM restrictions of PDF files, which may prevent copying, printing, or converting some PDF files, however this has been made optional, and turned off by default in gconf.

Since version 3.18.2, Evince allows for text and highlight annotations of documents.

== Supported document formats ==
Evince supports many different single and multi-page document formats:

Built-in support

- PDF using the Poppler backend
- PostScript using the Ghostscript backend.
- Multi-page TIFF
- DVI
- DjVu using the DjVuLibre backend
- OpenDocument Presentation (.odp) when built with the --enable-impress option
- Images (currently included as a toy, but needs work)
- CBR, CBZ, CB7 (Comic Book Archive file)
- Adobe Illustrator Artwork

Optional support

- XPS

Possible or planned support

- Microsoft PowerPoint using libpreview (currently alpha-quality)
- Microsoft Word
- OpenDocument
- AbiWord

Not supported

- EPUB
- Mobi

== See also ==
- List of PDF software
