= Docudesk =

Docudesk Corporation
- Type: Private
- Industry: Computer software Publishing; Research and development
- Founded: Houston, Texas (2001)
- Headquarters: Plano, Texas, United States
- Products: deskFONT deskPDF deskUNPDF; PDF Essentials
- Website: www.docudesk.com

Docudesk offers commercial PDF software for creating and converting portable document format (PDF) files. deskPDF is used for creating PDFs from Windows applications. The professional version includes PDF merging, Office integration, & 40-bit or 128-bit encryption. deskUNPDF converts PDFs to output formats including Microsoft Word (.doc), Microsoft Excel (.xls), and HTML. deskPDF provides support for the OSI 1.6 Portable Document Format standard.

== Company ==
Docudesk is a software company founded in 2001 with headquarters in Plano, Texas. The commercial Docudesk product line currently includes utilities for creating PDFs and converting PDFs. Docudesk is leveraging its experience in PDFs with DocQ.com an online "business center" to provide secure PDF storage, sharing, publishing, digital signatures, and annotations. The goal of DocQ is to provide a single venue for securely managing important documents, such as contracts and forms, and give unprecedented control over how they are shared with clients as well as collaborators.

== Products ==
=== deskPDF Standard ===
deskPDF Standard is a PDF creation utility which uses PostScript technology and allows for creation of PDFs from any file that can be printed, and can be used by virtually any Windows program. deskPDF provides support for the OSI 1.6 Portable Document Format standard.

deskPDF Screenshot

=== deskPDF Professional ===
deskPDF Professional features Microsoft Office integration including hyperlink, table of contents, and bookmark conversion. 128 bit security includes settings for controlling the printing and modification of the PDF, as well as password protection capabilities. The professional version also allows for merging PDFs, and placing stamps or a letterhead at the time of conversion.

=== deskUNPDF Standard ===
deskUNPDF Standard allows for conversion of a PDF into an editable format such as .doc or .rtf. The converted document can be modified by any word processor such as Word or Open Office Writer.

=== deskUNPDF Professional ===
In addition to PDF to Word capabilities, deskUNPDF Professional features PDF conversion to: .xls (Excel), .odt (Open Document), HTML, and image formats (.bmp, .jpg, .tif & .png). Other formats include .xhtml, .svg, .xml, .csv, .txt, and .lrf. (Sony Reader Format).

deskUNPDF Screenshot

=== deskUNPDF for Mac ===
deskUNPDF for Mac was released in January, 2008 and includes the same current feature set of deskUNPDF Professional for Windows. System requirements include either OS X 10.5 (Leopard) or OS X 10.4 (Tiger) operating systems. deskUNPDF for Mac version 3 was released in spring of 2009 and updated to support (Snow Leopard) or OS X 10.6

=== PDF Essentials Plus ===
PDF Essentials combines the PDF creation of deskPDF Professional with the conversion cabilities of deskUNPDF Standard. PDF Essentials Plus includes the additional output formats available in deskUNPDF Professional. With PDF Essentials Plus, any file which can be printed can be converted to any of the formats available in deskUNPDF, such as extracting tabular data from a website into an Excel spreadsheet, converting a Word document into an e-book format (.lrf), or saving a PowerPoint presentation as HTML.

== Enterprise and Terminal Services ==
Enterprise deployments, installation customization and license management are facilitated by the .MSI installers and Admin & Deployment Kit (ADK) including the deskPDF Configuration Tool (dCT).

Terminal Services and Citrix editions of deskPDF Standard, deskPDF Professional, deskUNPDF Standard, deskUNPDF Professional, PDF Essentials, & PDF Essentials Plus are available. The Terminal Services versions are fully supported for Windows Server 2003 and Windows Server 2008.

== Support Policies ==
Technical support for Docudesk products is available free for trial users and customers through the Knowledge Base and Support Center. Upgrades are provided free for 1 year with extensions offered for a fee.

== Docudesk Labs ==
Docudesk Labs offers technology previews and beta releases of future projects. Offerings previously featured includes DocQ - an online PDF editor. The primary features of the beta release:

- Annotation functionality such as the typewriter tool, sticky notes, hyperlinks and drawing tools.
- Creating PDFs with fillable forms such as text fields, check boxes, radio buttons, and combo and list boxes.
- Sharing & collaboration on PDFs by providing a link to the hosted PDF.

The PDFVue Firefox extension redirects PDFs through PDFVue, enabling viewing and annotation from within the browser. In addition, with the PDFVue OnRamp local documents are automatically uploaded to PDFVue and converted to text searchable PDFs for commenting and sharing.

Notable previous releases include deskUNPDF 2.0 Professional for Mac OS X and the Docudesk PRS Browser which allows content management of the Sony Reader PRS-500 in Mac OS X. The free PRS Browser is released under the GNU General Public License (GPL).

== See also ==
- PDF
- PostScript
- Terminal Services
- Citrix
- Sony Reader
