= CutePDF =

PDF file converter and editor

- Developer: Acro Software
- Stable release: 4.0 (Writer ed.) / April 18, 2020; 5 years ago
- Operating system: Microsoft Windows
- Type: PDF converter and editor
- License: Proprietary
- Website: www.cutepdf.com

CutePDF is a proprietary Portable Document Format converter and editor for Microsoft Windows developed by Acro Software. CutePDF Writer can create PDF files, and CutePDF Form Filler can edit simple PDF forms so that they can be sent without using more expensive PDF authoring software.

CutePDF can convert documents, images, and text. The software installs itself as a printer subsystem.

== Reception ==
Chip rated it 4 of out 5 stars. It has been recommended by Tech Republic (October 9, 2003), The Washington Post (May 2, 2009), and PC World (February 13, 2014).

== Controversy ==
In several historical versions, CutePDF bundles adware with its download.

Freeware Genius, in "The best freeware virtual PDF printer: a comparison" (June 16, 2011), wrote: "The virtual printers that we tried but decided to exclude from the comparison were Bolt PDF Printer, CutePDF Writer, ImagePrinter, pdf995, PDFlite and Primo PDF, mainly because they were inferior by functionality, configurability, or ease of use. Some (e.g. Primo PDF and CutePDF) were removed from the list for privacy considerations as they contain adware/spyware components." As of 19 June 2016, the installer attempts to install the Ask web browser toolbar, notorious for browser hijacking, and the OpenCandy adware.

== See also ==
- List of PDF software
