= PdfFiller =

Online document management service

pdfFiller
- Type: Product / Service
- Industry: Document management software
- Founded: 2008
- Headquarters: Boston, Massachusetts, U.S.
- Area served: Worldwide
- Products: Online PDF editor, form builder, e-signature tools
- Parent: airSlate
- Website: www.pdffiller.com

pdfFiller is a cloud-based online document management service and PDF editor developed and published by the software company airSlate. The service provides tools to upload, edit, convert, fill, sign, and share PDF documents, etc.

== History ==
pdfFiller was created in 2008 as a web application for filling and sending PDF forms online. It was created by Vadim Yasinovsky and launched as a product offering that later became part of a broader suite of document and workflow products under the airSlate brand. In subsequent years, the product portfolio expanded to include electronic signature functionality, form building and publishing, optical character recognition (OCR), API access, and integrations with third-party services.

== Products and features ==
pdfFiller's features include online PDF editing and annotation, creation of fillable forms, electronic signatures with workflows, document conversion (Word, Excel, JPG, etc.), access to legal and business templates, collaboration and cloud storage, mobile apps for Android and iOS, and API integrations with business applications. pdfFiller is offered as a subscription-based Software as a Service (SaaS). The service is accessible through a web browser and on mobile devices.

== Reception ==
Mahmoud Itani of Macworld penned a mostly negative review of pdfFiller, criticizing its reliability and its lacking advertised functionalities on the Mac brand. He said that there were more efficient PDF editors that were not only cheaper but also provide superior features. According to Itani, "I can't find a single reason why anyone would pick pdfFiller over alternative solutions." Michael Ansaldo, a contributor to PC World, praised pdfFiller for having an "an uncommonly deep set of features" and liked its document library.

TechRadar reviewer Steve Paris liked that pdfFiller allowed people to edit content together through its being an online platform and praised its password feature in safeguarding pages. He criticized the product for being expensive and did not like that it did not have a free tier. Tribune Content Agency's Harold Glicken thought that compared to commercial software, pdfFiller offers a more limited feature set, though he found it was "a good way to do some basic tasks".
