= Smallpdf.com =

Web-based PDF document software

Smallpdf
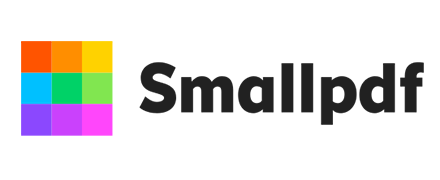
- Website type: Private
- Founded: August 2013
- Headquarters: Zürich, Switzerland
- Founders: Manuel Stofer; Mathis Büchi; Lino Teuteberg
- Industry: Software
- Website: smallpdf.com

Smallpdf is a Swiss online web-based PDF software, founded in 2013. It offers free version with limited features to compress, convert and edit PDF documents, and its paid version offers advanced features like OCR, compress, and more.

== History ==
Smallpdf was founded in 2013 by Mathis Büchi, Lino Teuteberg, and Manuel Stofer while they were living abroad in Korea. The idea came from the need for their families to compress and send large documents via email.

The initial version of the site featured a standalone PDF compression tool. Since then, the online platform has introduced over 16 PDF tools to convert, compress and edit PDF documents. As of 2019, approximately 25 million unique users use Smallpdf every month.

In November 2018, it was announced that Smallpdf would integrate with Dropbox as part of the 'Dropbox Extensions', to provide Dropbox users with PDF editing capabilities.

Smallpdf expanded through acquisition in March 2022, buying Zürich-based document-processing software company PDF Tools for US$30 million. PDF Tools had previously been a technology partner of Smallpdf.

In July 2026, Smallpdf sold PDF Tools to document-software company Apryse. Following the divestment, Smallpdf said it would concentrate on its own PDF software platform for individual and business users.

=== Technical partners ===
For some PDF to Office conversions, Smallpdf uses conversion technology developed by Solid Documents. Solid Documents is a New Zealand-based company offering desktop PDF solutions.

== See also ==
- List of PDF software
