= Universal Document Converter =

Virtual printer and PDF creator

- Developer(s): fCoder Group, Inc.
- Initial release: 10 August 2000; 25 years ago
- Stable release: 6.8 / December 18, 2017; 7 years ago
- Operating system: Microsoft Windows, Microsoft Windows Server
- Size: 22.9 MB
- Available in: 11 languages
- List of languages English, Russian, German, Japanese, Italian, French, Spanish, Ukrainian, Portuguese, Dutch, Arabic
- Type: Virtual printer
- License: Proprietary commercial software
- Website: www.print-driver.com

Universal Document Converter is a virtual printer and PDF creator for Microsoft Windows developed by fCoder Group. It can create PDF documents (as raster images or searchable text) and files in graphic formats JPEG, TIFF, PNG, GIF, PCX, DCX and BMP. It can create graphic or PDF files from any document that can be printed. There are full and demo versions.

== Features ==
Universal Document Converter is able to create large size files (print with resolution up to 6000 DPI and PDF files up to 10 GB since 2009) and can be used in professional projects.

- In 2006 Universal Document Converter 4.1 was tested for DELOS Digital Preservation Testbed project (Vienna University of Technology study on Long-Term Preservation of Electronic Theses and Dissertations) along with Adobe Acrobat 7 Professional
- In 2009 Harvard University had passingly mentioned Universal Document Converter as one of the programs for DWG to TIFF conversion

Universal Document Converter can also be used to create e-books.

== System requirements ==
- Supports 32-bit and 64-bit systems
- Universal Document Converter does not require GhostScript to generate the PDF files.
- Microsoft Windows 2000/XP/Vista/7/8/8.1/10 or Microsoft Windows Server 2003/2008/2012

== SDK ==
A public API is distributed with Universal Document Converter. It allows to integrate the software functions into third-party applications.
