= Pdf-parser =

pdf-parser
- Original author(s): Didier Stevens
- Initial release: May 2, 2008
- Written in: Python programming language
- Operating system: Multiplatform, including smart phones
- Type: PDF software
- License: Public domain
- Website: blog.didierstevens.com/programs/pdf-tools/

Pdf-parser is a command-line program that parses and analyses PDF documents. It provides features to extract raw data from PDF documents, like compressed images. pdf-parser can deal with malicious PDF documents that use obfuscation features of the PDF language. The tool can also be used to extract data from damaged or corrupt PDF documents.
