= DocHub =

Online PDF software

- Type: Subsidiary
- Industry: Document management software
- Founded: October 2014
- Headquarters: Boston, Massachusetts, U.S.
- Owner: airSlate, Inc.
- Website: dochub.com

DocHub is a web-based document management platform that enables users to edit, sign, and share PDF documents online. Launched in October 2014, DocHub integrates with Google Workspace apps — including Google Drive and Gmail — through add-ons available in the Google Workspace Marketplace. DocHub is based in Boston, Massachusetts. The platform is available in English and Spanish, and reports more than 100 million users worldwide.

== History ==
DocHub was founded in October 2014 by Chris Devor, who had previously established Macroplant, a software development company, in 2008. In its early years, DocHub focused on core PDF annotation and editing capabilities before progressively expanding into eSignature workflows, team collaboration features, and document management tools.

=== Acquisition ===
In July 2022, airSlate, Inc., a Boston-based document workflow and automation company, announced the acquisition of DocHub, an online PDF editor and document signing platform. The financial terms of the transaction were not disclosed. Following the acquisition, DocHub became part of airSlate’s product portfolio, which includes altaFlow (formerly airSlate), pdfFiller, SignNow, US Legal Forms, and Instapage.

The acquisition was part of airSlate's broader strategy to expand its presence in the Google Workspace Marketplace, where DocHub's add-on had accumulated over 57 million installs. Following the acquisition, Albert Lardizabal became General Manager of DocHub.

DocHub has been featured in TechRadar round-ups of free PDF readers and free PDF editors. On Trustpilot, DocHub is rated 4.8 out of 5 based on more than 2,800 reviews. Trustpilot’s AI-generated review summary (based on user reviews) states that reviewers frequently praise the platform's ease of use and intuitive interface, and describes positive experiences with the product's support. Some reviews also mention the availability of a free version for limited PDF editing and e-signature tasks.

== Features ==
=== PDF Editing ===
DocHub provides a set of tools for editing PDF documents directly in a web browser. Users can add text, highlight content, add annotations, and use a freehand drawing tool. The platform supports the creation of fillable form fields, page management operations, such as rotating, reordering, adding, and removing pages, as well as converting documents to PDF format and exporting PDFs to DOCX.

DocHub includes an AI Assistant feature that lets users ask questions about a document’s contents and receive answers, generate summaries and simplify language.

=== eSignature ===
DocHub includes electronic signature functionality that allows users to create a signature, initial, or date stamp and apply it to documents. Users can send signature requests to one or multiple recipients, use bulk send for high-volume signing workflows, and track the status of signature requests. The platform provides an audit trail for completed signature transactions to support record-keeping and verification.

=== Collaboration ===
DocHub supports collaboration through shared access to documents, comments, and user mentions. Documents can be shared via a direct link. For organizations, DocHub offers Organizations and Rooms features with different user roles and permissions.

== Security ==
=== Legal Bindings ===
DocHub supports two-factor authentication (2FA) and single sign-on (SSO) for account access. Documents can be protected with passwords and access controls to restrict document visibility and editing permissions. The platform aligns with SOC 2 and HIPAA standards and is designed in accordance with the requirements of the General Data Protection Regulation (GDPR).

All documents are encrypted with 256-bit encryption and stored in a centralized, secure vault accessible from any device.

== Cross-Platform Availability ==
DocHub is accessible through any modern web browser without requiring software installation. It is available as an add-on for Google Drive and Gmail through the Google Workspace Marketplace, and as an extension for Microsoft Edge. Mobile applications are available for iOS and Android devices.
