= PDFCreator =

Application to convert files to PDFs

- Developer: pdfforge GmbH
- Stable release: 6.3.0 (June 30, 2026; 4 months ago) [±]
- Written in: C#
- Operating system: Microsoft Windows
- Available in: Multilingual
- Type: PDF printer/creator
- License: Mixed proprietary and open-source: GNU AGPL; Ghostscript: GNU GPL; pdfcmon.dll: pdfforge Freeware License; iTextSharp.dll: GNU AGPL
- Website: www.pdfforge.org
- Repository: github.com/pdfforge/PDFCreator

PDFCreator is an application for converting documents into Portable Document Format (PDF) format on Microsoft Windows operating systems. It works by creating a virtual printer that prints to PDF files, and thereby allows practically any application to create PDF files by choosing to print from within the application and then printing to the PDFCreator printer. It was first released in Germany in 2004.

In addition to PDFCreator Free, there are three business editions with additional features: PDFCreator Professional, PDFCreator Server and PDFCreator Terminal Server.

== Implementation ==
The application is written in Microsoft C# and released to the public at no charge. It works with 64-bit Windows versions including Windows 11. The actual PDF generation is handled by Ghostscript, which is included in the setup packages.

Besides being installed as a virtual printer, PDFCreator can be associated with .ps files to manually convert PostScript to PDF format.

PDFCreator can convert to the following file formats: PDF (including PDF/A (PDF/A-1b, PDF/A-2b and PDF/A-3b) and PDF/X (X-3:2002, X-3:2003 and X-4)), PNG, JPEG, TIFF, TXT. It also lets users digitally sign PDF documents.

PDFCreator allows any COM-enabled application to make use of its functionality. The business editions of PDFCreator allow users to write their own C# scripts with access to the entire job data. These custom scripts can be integrated directly before and after the conversion. They have full access to the .NET Framework and can reference compatible external libraries.

PDFCreator allows the user to disable printing, copying of text or images and modifying the original document. The user can also choose between two types of passwords, user and owner, to restrict PDF files in several ways. The former is required to open the PDF file, while the latter is necessary in order to change permissions and password. Encryption can be either Low (128-bit), Medium (128-bit AES) or High (256-bit AES), with the latter only being available in the PDFCreator Business editions.

PDFCreator provides the possibility for automating certain tasks, for example with the help of user tokens. These placeholders for values, like today’s date, username, or e-mail address can be helpful when printing many similar files like invoices.

With PDFCreator users can verify their authorship of a document with digital signatures. This feature is part of all PDFCreator editions, including PDFCreator Free.

Starting with version 4.4.0 there was full support for Windows 11.

After the Component Object Model (COM) interface in version 6.0.0 of in PDFCreator Free was unavailable in April 2025, it was restored in July 2025 with version 6.1.0.

== Editions ==
PDFCreator is open source and freeware. The code can be downloaded and modified.

In addition to PDFCreator Free there are three commercial editions. All of them allow administrators to predefine specific settings centrally.

PDFCreator Professional
This version can be installed silently in Windows domains, which is not possible in PDFCreator Free.
PDFCreator Terminal Server
It has been developed for the use on Windows Servers with installed Remote Desktop Services and on Citrix Servers. Print jobs can be assigned securely to separate user sessions. Only one license key is needed per terminal server and it is valid for an unlimited number of users.
PDFCreator Server
This works as Windows service application. It allows the central management of settings and users for administrator. Additionally, it lets the user share PDFCreator printers in their network, auto-convert without user interaction and it offers high performance through multi-threading.

== Adware toolbar controversy ==
Between 2009 and 2013 the installation package included a closed-source browser toolbar that was considered by many users to be malicious software. Although technically an optional component, the opt-out procedure was considered by many to be intentionally confusing. As of version 1.2.3, the opt-out procedure only required unchecking one checkbox during the installation process.

In March 2012 the company announced that the toolbar had been discontinued with version 1.3.0.

== See also ==
- List of PDF software
- List of virtual printer software
