= Adobe Sign =

E-signature service

Adobe Acrobat Sign
- Developer: Adobe Inc. (acquired as EchoSign)
- Release: January 2006 (as EchoSign).
- Operating system: Windows, macOS, iOS, Android
- Available in: 34 languages
- List of languages English (United States), English (United Kingdom), French, German, Spanish, Catalan, Basque, Brazilian Portuguese, Portuguese, Japanese, Chinese (simplified), Chinese (traditional), Korean, Indonesian, Malay, Thai, Vietnamese, Croatian, Czech, Polish, Romanian, Russian, Slovene, Slovak, Turkish, Ukrainian, Danish, Dutch, Finnish, Hungarian, Icelandic, Italian, Norwegian and Swedish
- Type: Software
- License: Proprietary, Commercial Software
- Website: AdobeSign

Adobe Acrobat Sign (formerly EchoSign, eSign & Adobe Sign) is a cloud-based e-signature service that allows the user to send, sign, track, and manage signature processes using a browser or mobile device. It is part of the Adobe Document Cloud suite of services.

Adobe Sign also supports Sandbox environment for Enterprise tier customers to test templates, customer workflows, and more. These objects can be moved from production to the sandbox for updates in a safe environment, then moved back to production once the updates are verified and ready for deployment.

== History ==
On July 18, 2011, Adobe Systems announced its acquisition of the web-based electronic signatures company EchoSign which would become the basis for the Adobe Sign product. By December of that year, Adobe Systems released a mobile application of the product for iOS. In 2016 Adobe Sign was introduced as a way to request, receive, and submit e-signatures. The product offers integrations with Dropbox, Salesforce, Workday, Box and Microsoft OneDrive.

In October 2020, Adobe signed a deal with online notarization provider Notarize to integrate the company's remote online notarization capability into Adobe Sign.

On April 5, 2022, Adobe renamed the product from Adobe Sign to Adobe Acrobat Sign, aligning standalone subscriptions with the Adobe Acrobat.

== Products ==
Adobe Sign is sold in subscriptions at the individual, small business, or enterprise level. Some of the services available are:

- Sign forms with an electronic signature or digital signature
- Request e-signatures
- Create branded forms
- Track responses, get email notifications, and send reminders for e-signatures
- Create workflows to gather signatures from multiple users

Adobe Sign is continuously maintained with new releases that feature refreshes of legal forms, security updates, and other product enhancements.

== See also ==
- Docusign
- Electronic signature
- Handwriting recognition
- OneSpan
- PandaDoc
- SignNow
- Title 21 CFR Part 11
- Uniform Electronic Transactions Act
