= LibHaru =

libHaru
- Stable release: 2.4.6 / 2026-03-26
- Written in: ANSI C
- Operating system: Cross-platform
- Type: Software Library
- License: ZLIB/LIBPNG Licence
- Website: libharu.org
- Repository: github.com/libharu/libharu

libHaru is a free, open-source, cross platform library for generating PDF files for applications written in C or C++. It is not intended for reading and editing existing PDF files.

It supports the following features:

- Generating PDF files with lines, text, images.
- Outline, text annotation, link annotation.
- Compressing document with deflate-decode.
- Embedding PNG, JPEG images.
- Embedding Type1 font and TrueType font.
- Creating encrypted PDF files.
- Using various character sets (ISO8859-1~16, MS CP1250~8, KOI8-R).
- Supporting CJK fonts and encodings.

== Supporting compilers and programming languages ==
libHaru is written in ANSI C and should compile easily with any compliant C compiler.

It tested in the following environment:

- Cygwin + GCC (Windows).
- Cygwin + MinGW (Windows).
- Microsoft VC++ (Windows).
- Borland C++ (Windows).
- GCC (Linux, FreeBSD, NetBSD, Solaris, MorphOS...).

libHaru can be used as a static library or as a dynamic library.

When you use it as static-library, it can be used by C and a C++. But when you use it as shared-library, it can be used by many development languages which support shared library.

libharu provides bindings for programming languages:

- C++
- C#
- Delphi
- FreeBASIC
- Free Pascal
- Python
- Ruby
- Visual Basic
- PHP
- Perl
- Lua
- JavaScript
