= Apache PDFBox =

Open-source PDF library

PDFBox
- Developer: Apache Software Foundation
Stable release
- 1.8.x: 1.8.17 / 15 September 2022; 3 years ago
- 2.0.x: 2.0.37 / 15 July 2026; 43 days ago
- 3.0.x: 3.0.8 / 11 July 2026; 47 days ago
- Written in: Java
- Operating system: Cross-platform
- Type: Portable Document Format (PDF)
- License: Apache License 2.0
- Website: pdfbox.apache.org
- Repository: PDFBox Repository (Mirror)

Apache PDFBox is an open source pure-Java library that can be used to create, render, print, split, merge, alter, verify and extract text and meta-data of PDF files.

Open Hub reports over 11,000 commits (since the start as an Apache project) by 18 contributors representing more than 140,000 lines of code. PDFBox has a well established, mature codebase maintained by an average size development team with increasing year-over-year commits. Using the COCOMO model, it took an estimated 46 person-years of effort.

== Structure ==
Apache PDFBox has these components:

- PDFBox: the main part
- FontBox: handles font information
- XmpBox: handles XMP metadata
- Preflight (optional): checks PDF files for PDF/A-1b conformity.

== History ==
PDFBox was started in 2002 in SourceForge by Ben Litchfield who wanted to be able to extract text of PDF files for Lucene. It became an Apache Incubator project in 2008, and an Apache top level project in 2009.

Preflight was originally named PaDaF and developed by Atos worldline, and donated to the project in 2011.

In February 2015, Apache PDFBox was named an Open Source Partner Organization of the PDF Association.

== See also ==
- List of PDF software
