= Bluebeam Software =

American software company

Bluebeam Software, Inc.
- Type: Private
- Industry: Software
- Founded: 2002; 24 years ago
- Headquarters: Pasadena, California, United States
- Area served: Worldwide
- Products: Bluebeam Revu; Bluebeam Max; Bluebeam Vu iPad; Studio Server
- Number of employees: 500
- Parent: Nemetschek SE
- Website: bluebeam.com

Bluebeam Software, Inc. is an American software company founded in 2002 and headquartered in Pasadena, California, United States, with additional offices in Dallas, London, Stockholm, Munich, and Brisbane. The company specializes in designing tools for creating, editing, marking up, collaborating and sharing PDF documents. Their main products are Bluebeam Revu and Bluebeam Max.

In October 2014, Bluebeam was acquired by Nemetschek for $100 million.

== Products ==
Bluebeam Software's products include:

- Bluebeam Revu for PDF creation, markup and editing.
- Bluebeam Max is Bluebeam’s premium, AI-powered subscription that helps AEC teams accelerate reviews, automate repetitive work, and connect PDF workflows more closely with BIM
- Bluebeam Vu iPad, a complimentary iPad app for PDF viewing.
- Studio Server is a server-based program for firms that want to use Bluebeam Studio to collaborate and share information in a locally hosted environment.
