= Nitro Software =

Proprietary PDF creator and editor

Nitro PDF Pro
- The Nitro PDF Pro logo
- Developers: Nitro Software, Inc.
- Stable release: 14.39.0.18 / 26 June 2025; 12 months ago
- Operating system: Microsoft Windows Mac OS iOS
- Available in: English
- Type: Desktop publishing software
- License: Trialware
- Website: www.gonitro.com

Nitro PDF Pro is a Portable Document Format (PDF) editing application and electronic signature software.

== History ==
Nitro Software was founded in Melbourne, Australia in 2005 to develop an alternative PDF software to Adobe Acrobat.

In 2015, the company had sold 1 million licenses.

In June 2021, the company acquired PDFPen, a PDF editing app for Mac, iPad, and iPhone.

== Controversy ==
In May 2025, the company sent a letter to all owners of perpetual licenses older than version 13, informing them that their previously lifetime license will be deactivated unless they upgraded to a subscription model.

As of June 2025, Nitro Software was graded F by the Better Business Bureau for the company's failure to respond to customer complaints. As a result, Nitro Software is no longer rated by Better Business Bureau.

== See also ==
- List of PDF software
