= Virtual printer =

Simulated device resembling a printer driver

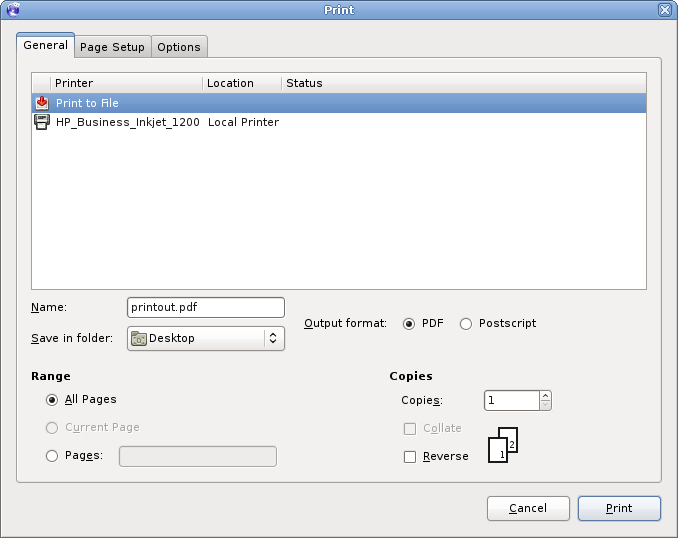
A GTK+ dialog box for printing to either a virtual printer (to create a PDF or PostScript file) or a physical printer

In computing a virtual printer is a simulated device whose user interface and API resemble that of a printer driver, but which is not connected to a physical computer printer.

When a document is "printed" by a virtual printer, instead of physically printing it on paper or other material the underlying software processes the images of its pages in some other way, often resulting in a file being produced or the images being transmitted.

== History ==
In the early 1960s the B5500 Master Control Program (MCP) operating system included virtual printers, called "Printer Backups" in the form of Printer Backup Tapes (PBT) and Printer Backup Disks (PBD). IBM's VM/370 operating system allows users to spool a virtual printer (or punch) file to another user, who can read it as input. This provides a basic means of file transfer.

== Functions ==
Typical uses of virtual printers include:

- Saving a document to another format such as a PDF or multi-page TIFF file.
- Sending documents to a fax server.
- Allowing user to control certain aspects of printing not supported natively, such as printing multiple pages per sheet without border, print letterhead, watermarks etc. This output can either be saved in a file for future printing or passed to another printer.
- Previewing a printed document before printing it, to save ink and paper. This functionality is also built into many GUI applications.
- Allowing remote printing of documents over the Internet. At least one example of this technology creates a virtual printer on one computer which actually converts the document and sends it to a remote server, from which the file can be printed to a printer attached to a PC in a remote location. Similar technology is also being used to allow printing from devices such as smart phones.

== See also ==
- List of virtual printer software
- Spooling
