= List of software under the GNU AGPL =

This is an incomplete list of software that are licensed under the GNU Affero General Public License, in alphabetical order.

- 4get - metasearch engine
- Akvo platform - data platform for Sustainable Development Goals and international development tracking
- Alaveteli - help citizens write freedom of Information requests and automatically publish any responses.
- Ampache - web-based audio/video streaming application
- Anki - the desktop version is under GNU AGPL, the Android version is under GPLv3.0
- Bacula
- BEdita 3 Open
- BerkeleyDB - a B-tree NoSQL database developed by Oracle, the open source license is under GNU AGPL
- Bike Index - the most widely used and successful bicycle registration service in the world
- Bitwarden password management service server code
- Booktype - online book production platform
- CiviCRM the open-source CRM for non-profits with its mobile application CiviMobile.
- CKAN - data management system
- Co-Ment - online text annotation and collaborative writing
- Diaspora
- Duolicious
- ElasticSearch - a search engine - since version 8.16.0
- Element - Decentralized chat and collaboration software
- Evercam - Camera management software
- F-Droid
- Feng Office Community Edition
- FreeJ
- FreePBX
- Frei0r
- Friendica
- Genenetwork
- Genode - Microkernel-based operating system framework
- Ghostscript
- Gitorious
- GlobaLeaks
- GNUnet - Internet-like anonymous peer-to-peer network stack
- Grafana
- HumHub - Social network software
- Instructure Canvas
- Invidious
- iText
- Joplin - note-taking and to-do list application
- Kune - collaborative social network
- Launchpad
- Lemmy - social network
- Lichess
- Loomio
- Mastodon
- Mattermost server code
- MediaGoblin
- Minds
- Minio
- MongoDB - until late 2018, when they switched to SSPL
- MuPDF - a lightweight and high-quality PDF reader developed by Artifex Software Inc
- Nextcloud - private cloud software
- Nightscout
- OnlyOffice - MS Office compatible free software office suite
- Opa - a web application programming language
- OpenBroadcaster
- OpenBTS
- OpenCog
- Open edX
- Open Library
- OpenRemote - IoT middleware
- Overleaf - collaborative LaTeX editor used for writing, editing and publishing scientific documents
- OvenMediaEngine - low latency streaming server
- ownCloud
- PeerTube
- POV-Ray
- Proxmox Virtual Environment - a server virtualization management platform
- Public Whip
- RapidMiner - data mining suite, old versions are released as AGPL
- Redis
- Redlib - alternative Reddit frontend
- RStudio
- Seafile
- Searx - metasearch engine succeeded by SearXNG under the same AGPL license
- SearXNG
- SecureDrop
- Seeks
- SequoiaDB
- Signal
- SimpleX Chat
- Snap!
- Sones GraphDB
- StatusNet
- stet
- SugarCRM (community edition)
- Wiki.js - A wiki application built on Node.js
- WURFL
- Zarafa
- Zotero
