= Feng Office Community Edition =

Open-source collaboration software

- Developer: Feng Office
- Stable release: 3.11.13.11 / 15 December 2025
- Operating system: Cross-platform, Linux, Mac OS X, Windows
- Available in: Multilingual
- Type: Online office suite
- License: Since 1.6.1: AGPL-3.0-only; 1.1 to 1.6 (Note: As OpenGoo): AGPL-3.0-only; 0.1 to 1.0: HPL-1.0 (Note: Honest Public License, Version 1, August 2006)
- Website: www.fengoffice.com/web/opensource/
- Repository: github.com/fengoffice/fengoffice

Feng Office Community Edition (formerly OpenGoo) is an open-source collaboration platform developed and supported by Feng Office and the OpenGoo community. It is a fully featured online office suite with a similar set of features as other online office suites, like Google Workspace, Microsoft 365, Zimbra, LibreOffice Online and Zoho Office Suite. The application can be downloaded and installed on a server.

Feng Office could also be categorized as collaborative software and as personal information manager software.

== Features ==
Feng Office Community Edition main features include project management, document management, contact management, e-mail and time management. Text documents and presentations can be created and edited online. Files can be uploaded, organized and shared, independent of file formats.

Organization of the information in Feng Office Community Edition is done using workspaces and tags.

The application presents the information stored using different interfaces such as lists, dashboards and calendar views.

== Licensing ==
Feng Office Community Edition is distributed under the GNU Affero General Public License, version 3 only.

== Technology used ==
Feng Office uses PHP, JavaScript, AJAX (ExtJS) and MySQL technology.

Several open source projects served as a basis for development. ActiveCollab's last open sourced release was used as the initial code base. It includes CKEditor for online document editing.

== System requirements ==
The server could run on any operating system. The system needs the following packages:

- Apache HTTP Server 2.0+
- PHP 5.0+
- MySQL 4.1+ (InnoDB support recommended)

On the client side, the user is only required to use a modern Web browser.

== History ==
Former logo

OpenGoo started as a degree project at the faculty of Engineering of the University of the Republic, Uruguay. The project was presented and championed by Software Engineer Conrado Viña. Software Engineers Marcos Saiz and Ignacio de Soto developed the first prototype as their thesis. Professors Eduardo Fernández and Tomas Laurenzo served as tutors. Conrado, Ignacio and Marcos founded the OpenGoo community and remain active members and core developers. The thesis was approved with the highest score. In 2008, Viña joined the Uruguayan software development company Moove It.

Currently there is a second project for OpenGoo at the same university being developed by students Fernando Rodríguez, Ignacio Vázquez and Juan Pedro del Campo. Their project aims to build an open source Web-based spreadsheet.

In December 2009 the OpenGoo name was changed to Feng Office Community Edition.

== See also ==
- Collaborative software
- Comparison of office suites
- Free Software licensing
- List of AGPL web applications
- List of office suites
- List of project management software
