= Manning's Law =

Manning's Law describes the combination of principles that need to be balanced in the design and growth of universal linguistic dependencies. These dependencies are used to describe and model syntactic relations, for all languages. This supports natural language processing, and is a major topic, with its own event, thousands of linguistics and AI researchers working with and on it, and widely-adopted. The law was put forward by Christopher D. Manning.

== The Six Directives ==
Manning's Law has been described as consisting of six directives, which may not necessarily all apply simultaneously, and are often in conflict to some degree:

1. UD needs to be satisfactory for analysis of individual languages.
2. UD needs to be good for linguistic typology.
3. UD must be suitable for rapid, consistent annotation.
4. UD must be easily comprehended and used by a non-linguist.
5. UD must be suitable for computer parsing with high accuracy.
6. UD must provide good support for downstream NLP tasks.

Manning's Law is not the six criteria in themselves, but rather the statement that it is easy to improve UD with respect to a single criterion but hard to improve UD with respect to all criteria at once.
