= Hypothesis (disambiguation) =

A hypothesis is a proposed explanation for a phenomenon.

Hypothesis may also refer to:

- Hypothesis (album), music by Vangelis
- Hypothesis (drama), in ancient usage, a summary of the plot of a classical drama
- Hypothesis of a theorem, in mathematics
- Hypothes.is, a website annotation software
- Hypothesis Z, the first Romanian war plan for World War I

Hypothetical may also refer to:

- Hypothetical mood, a grammatical mood found in some languages
- Geoffrey Robertson's Hypotheticals, an Australian TV panel show
- Hypothetical (album), a 2001 progressive metal album
- Hypothetical (TV series), a comedy TV show
