= Annotea =

In metadata, Annotea was designed as an RDF standard sponsored by the W3C to enhance document-based collaboration via shared document metadata based on tags, bookmarks, and other annotations.

In this case document metadata includes:

- Keywords
- Comments
- Notes
- Explanations
- Errors
- Corrections

In general, Annotea associates text strings to a web document or selected parts of a web document without actually needing to modify the original document.

Users that access any web documents can also load the metadata associated with it from a selected annotation server (or groups of servers) and see a peer group's comments on the document. Similarly shared metadata tags can be attached to web documents to help in future retrieval.

Annotea is an extensible standard and is designed to work with other W3C standards when possible. For instance, Annotea uses an RDF Schema for describing annotations as metadata and XPointer for locating the annotations in the annotated document. Similarly a bookmark schema describes the bookmark and topic metadata.

Annotea is part of the W3C Semantic Web efforts.

An example implementation of Annotea is W3C's Amaya editor/browser. The current Amaya user interface for annotations is presented in the Amaya documentation. Other projects consists of Plugins for Firefox/Mozilla or Annotatio Client which interacts with most browsers per JavaScript.

Active development of Annotea seems to have been discontinued after 2003, as a W3C standard for annotation of documents on the webs, it is superseded by Web Annotation.

== See also ==
- Web annotation
- Metadata
- Folksonomy
- World Wide Web
