= Tara Mohanan =

Indian linguist

- Occupations: Linguist, entrepreneur

Tara Mohanan is a linguist and co-founder of ThinQ, an educational organisation. She is known for work on Hindi, Malayalam, and other South Asian languages in the fields of semantics, syntax, morphology, and phonology. Her husband is linguist K. P. Mohanan.

== Academic career ==
Mohanan did her Bachelor's and Master's in English Literature at Calicut University, followed by an MLitt. in Linguistics at the Central Institute of English and Foreign Languages (now EFLU). Mohanan completed her doctorate in linguistics at Stanford University in 1990, with her thesis entitled Arguments in Hindi. In that, she introduced a unique grammatical formalism to describe Hindi syntax based on empirical data. She taught linguistics at the National University of Singapore until 2006, where she designed an undergraduate program in linguistics with K. P. Mohanan.

=== Contributions to Hindi syntax ===
Mohanan's dissertation, Arguments in Hindi (published as a book entitled Argument Structure in Hindi in 1994), has had a lasting influence on the study of the syntax of Hindi and other South Asian languages. Some of the major issues in Hindi linguistics that she considers in her dissertation are:

- Case marking: notably, differential object marking with the Hindi accusative case marker ko.
- Verb agreement: including foundational theoretical work on the noun + verb construction in Hindi, analysed as object incorporation.
- Non-nominative subjects: claims that Hindi has genitive and dative-marked subjects, besides the prototypical nominative/ergative-marked one.

Her later paper on object incorporation in Hindi further expanded her theoretical separation of grammatical categories and grammatical functions: a case-less object + verb construction in Hindi could be analysed as serving the function of the verb, while retaining syntactic properties that allow the verb to agree with the incorporated noun. She distinguished this from the complex predicate in Hindi, wherein a noun + verb or verb + verb construction results in combined argument structure that neither could have by itself (e.g. the complex N+V predicate yād karnā "to remember" in Hindi can take an object of its own).

Her analyses of Hindi complex predicates and incorporated objects has been retained in more recent work, such as that by Miriam Butt on complex predicates in Urdu–Hindi. Modern dependency annotation schemes for South Asian languages, which have been used to make syntactically parsed treebanks for computational analysis, also reference her work.

== Works ==
- — (1989). "Syllable structure in Malayalam". Linguistic Inquiry: 589–625.
- — (1990). Arguments in Hindi (PhD). Stanford University.
- — (1994). Argument structure in Hindi. Dissertations in Linguistics. Stanford, CA: CSLI Publications.
- — (1995). "Wordhood and lexicality: Noun incorporation in Hindi". Natural Language & Linguistic Theory. 13 (1): 75–134. doi:10.1007/BF00992779. S2CID 170667125.
