= Hypothes.is =

American social annotation software platform

Hypothesis
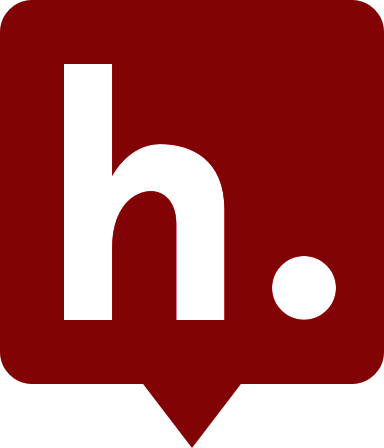
- Founded: July 1, 2011 (as the Hypothes.is Project)
- Founder: Dan Whaley
- Type: Public benefit corporation
- Location: San Francisco, California
- Key people: Joe Ferraro (CEO)
- Website: hypothes.is

Hypothesis, originally styled Hypothes.is, is an open-source social annotation platform that allows users to highlight and annotate web pages, PDF files and other digital content. It is operated by Annotation Unlimited, PBC, a public benefit corporation incorporated in 2019.

The platform is used in higher education, where it works inside learning management systems.

== History ==
Originally launched in 2011 as the non-profit Hypothes.is Project, Hypothesis was founded by Dan Whaley, co-founder of GetThere. As described in 2011, the project aimed to collect comments about statements made in any web-accessible content, and to filter and rank those comments through a reputation system to assess each statement's credibility. It was summarized at the time as "a peer review layer for the entire Internet." Its advisors included John Perry Barlow, Charles Bazerman, Philip Bourne and Brewster Kahle.

A Kickstarter drive to raise $100,000 to fund a working prototype narrowly reached its goal on November 13, 2011. The effort was organized as a non-profit. The non-profit received financial support from the Shuttleworth Foundation, the Alfred P. Sloan Foundation, the Helmsley Trust, the Knight Foundation and the Andrew W. Mellon Foundation.

Whaley introduced the work of the World Wide Web Consortium (W3C) Web Annotation Working Group at the consortium's technical plenary in 2014. In December 2015, the Hypothes.is Project was a founding member of a coalition of scholarly publishers, platforms, libraries, and technology organizations to create an open, interoperable annotation layer over their content. The W3C working group published three Recommendations in February 2017, setting out a standard data model, vocabulary and protocol for web annotation. Elsevier began letting readers annotate its journal articles with their Elsevier logins in 2018, after comparable arrangements with MIT Press, the American Geophysical Union, eLife and bioRxiv.

Annotation Unlimited, PBC, a company incorporated in Delaware in March 2019, took over development of the software from the non-profit. By May 2019, more than five million annotations had been posted with the software. In August 2022, after noting that being a non-profit limited the project to grants and donations and with several of the key funding sources the Hypothes.is Project relied on no longer available, the company publicly introduced itself as Anno. Anno is a public benefit corporation, a form that allows it to take outside investment. It raised a $14 million seed round, including $2.5 million from ITHAKA, the provider of JSTOR. The Hypothes.is Project continues separately as a non-profit working on advocacy and open annotation standards. In June 2024, Joe Ferraro succeeded Whaley as chief executive of the company.

== Operations ==
Hypothesis works as a layer of commentary over pages published by other people. Because comments are kept on the service's own servers and shown over the page rather than written into it, content can be annotated without involving whoever published it. It can be used through a browser extension or through a link that routes a page via the service, and publishers can embed the software on their own sites.

Comments can be public, shared with a group, or visible only to their author. Public ones are placed in the public domain under the CC0 dedication, while private and group comments remain the property of their author. The browser extension is free to use, and colleges and universities pay a fee to run the service inside their learning management systems.

== Use in education ==
In teaching, the practice is known as social annotation: a class marks up the same assigned text, and students reply to one another in the margins. An application for learning management systems places annotation assignments inside the course site. Institutions have deployed it in Canvas, Blackboard Learn, D2L Brightspace and Moodle. Undergraduate use grew after teaching moved online during the COVID-19 pandemic, and results depend on how clearly instructors frame the task.

== Research ==
Studies have examined how Hypothesis and similar tools are used in teaching. A 2022 case study in F1000Research examined how undergraduates in three courses used Hypothesis to build knowledge together. It found that students most often used annotations to interpret and elaborate on the readings, and that replies between students were relatively uncommon. A study published the same year in Technology, Mind, and Behavior examined technologies for peer interaction during the shift to remote teaching in the COVID-19 pandemic, including social annotation tools such as Hypothesis. It found that the use of such technologies was associated with better student performance and a greater sense of belonging. A comparison in Frontiers in Education, also from 2022, found similar annotation quality on Hypothesis and Perusall, and most students in that study preferred annotation-based assessment to a conventional template-based assignment.

Digital library research has examined how Hypothes.is annotations become detached from their text when web pages change. Nature surveyed attempts to build an annotation layer over the research literature in 2015 and discussed Hypothes.is among them.

== See also ==
- Text annotation
- Web annotation
