= Third Voice (disambiguation) =

Third Voice is a software programme.

(The) Third Voice or (The) 3rd Voice may also refer to:

- The 3rd Voice (also known as The Third Voice), 1960 American thriller crime drama film directed and written by Hubert Cornfield
- "The Third Voice", 2016 episode of Murder (UK TV series)
- 3rd Voice is a fantasy webcomic serial written by Evan Dahm starting in 2022.
