= Feng Office =

- Type: Private
- Industry: Project Management Software
- Founded: 2008
- Founder: Conrado Viña
- Headquarters: Austin, Texas, Montevideo, Uruguay
- Key people: Conrado Viña, Sergio Riestra, Marcos Saiz, Ignacio de Soto
- Products: Team collaboration and Project Management
- Website: www.fengoffice.com

Feng Office is a software development company originally from Uruguay and headquartered in Austin, Texas, USA. The company is known for developing Feng Office Collaboration Platform (Feng Office Software) and associated services.

- Feng Sky [1] is Feng Office on Demand provided as a SaaS
- Feng Onsite [2] is a Feng Office platform installed on external servers
- Feng Office Community Edition[3] is the open-source self-installed and self-supported version
- Feng Office Essential is the entry-level edition of the software
- Feng Office Professional is the mid-tier edition, with the addition of the Manager role
- Feng Office Enterprise provides the complete power of the tool with multiple benefits from plugin-ins and reports

== History ==
Feng Office started as The OpenGoo Open Source Project, a degree project at the faculty of Engineering of the University of the Republic, Uruguay. The project was presented and championed by software engineer Conrado Viña. Software engineers Marcos Saiz and Ignacio de Soto developed the first prototype as their thesis. Professors Eduardo Fernández and Tomas Laurenzo served as tutors. Conrado, Ignacio and Marcos founded the OpenGoo community and remain active members and core developers. The thesis was approved with the highest score.

In 2008 Conrado Viña, Marcos Saiz, Sergio Riestra and Ignacio de Soto started the company Feng Office, taking care of the development and support for the OpenGoo project. In December 2009, Feng Office decided to rebrand OpenGoo as Feng Office.

See also

- Online office suite
- SaaS
- Open source
- Cloud computing
- Computer user satisfaction
- Software plus services
