= Moove It =

Software engineering company

- Type: Private
- Industry: Technology
- Founded: 2006; 20 years ago in Montevideo, Uruguay
- Founder: Martín Cabrera
- Headquarters: Austin, Texas, U.S.
- Key people: Martín Cabrera; Ariel Ludueña; Conrado Viña
- Website: Official website

Moove It is a software engineering company based in Austin, Texas, with offices in San Francisco, Montevideo and Cali. The company specializes in the design, development and implementation of technology applications in several areas like education, health, financial technology, entertainment and telecommunications. Its clients include companies like Disney Streaming Services, Hulu, Ripple, Shopify, Unilever and Bancard, among others.

== History ==
Moove It was founded in Montevideo, Uruguay in 2006 by Martín Cabrera, a systems engineer who graduated from the University of the Republic, as a small business selling IP cameras. Later, they started to focus on consulting and software development.

In 2008, systems engineers Ariel Ludueña (from the software development company Boutique), and Conrado Viña (creator of the Feng Office application), joined the company. A year later, they were hired by an American company called Staton and decided to focus most of their operations in the United States, initially developing applications with Ruby on Rails, an open source framework. Gradually they included other types of development technologies to expand their portfolio.

In 2014 the company created StartUp House, a hostel for entrepreneurs that offered cooperative workspace and web hosting. In 2015 Moove It experienced financial growth with the arrival of internationally recognized clients and two years later established its headquarters in Austin, Texas. In 2018 it made a $150,000 investment in brand modernization.

In 2019 it started operations in the city of Cali, Colombia. By that year, Moove It had achieved an average growth of 30% and, although 70% growth was expected in 2020, the COVID-19 pandemic did not allow reaching those numbers. In June 2020 Moove It invested in Marvik, an Uruguayan company specialized in machine learning.

In May 2023, Moove It merged with another Uruguayan technology company, December Labs, to establish a new firm named Qubika. The merger was backed by the private equity fund Recognize, which described the deal as its first investment in Latin America.

== Services ==
Moove It specializes in the design, development and branding of software applications using programming technologies such as Ruby on Rails, JavaScript, AngularJS and Node.js, among others. 40% of its turnover comes from companies in the healthcare industry such as Catapult Health, PrescribeWellness and Tabula Rasa. Another 20% comes from fintech and entertainment companies such as Disney Streaming Services, Shopify, Ripple and Hulu, and the remaining from other types of educational, telecommunications and banking companies such as Bancard, Banco de Crédito de Bolivia and Banco de Crédito del Perú, among others.

The company was certified by the consulting firm PricewaterhouseCoopers with an NPS of 82.02 and in November 2020 obtained the Great Place to Work certificate.
