= Dan Klein =

American computer scientist

Daniel Klein
- Born: 1976 (age 49–50)
- Education: Cornell University (B.A.); University of Oxford (MSt); Stanford University Ph.D.
- Known for: Natural Language Processing
- Awards: Marshall scholarship Grace Murray Hopper Award; Sloan Research Fellowship; NSF Career Award
- Scientific career
- Fields: Computer science
- Workplaces: University of California, Berkeley
- Doctoral advisor: Christopher D. Manning

Daniel Klein (born c. 1976) is an American computer scientist and professor of computer science at the University of California, Berkeley. His research focuses on natural language processing and artificial intelligence.

He was educated at Mt. Lebanon High School in Mt. Lebanon Township, Pennsylvania and earned a B.A. in mathematics, computer science, and linguistics from Cornell University (1998), a MSt in linguistics by Oxford University (1999) and a Ph.D. from Stanford University (2004), under Christopher D. Manning. He attended Oxford on a Marshall Scholarship. In addition to the Marshall scholarship, he has been awarded the ACM's Grace Murray Hopper Award, the Sloan Research Fellowship, the NSF CAREER Award, and the Microsoft New Faculty Fellowship.
