= SharedCopy =

- Website type: Web Annotation, AJAX, Mash-Up
- Owner: Chew Choon Keat
- Website: https://web.archive.org/web/20071125101516/http://sharedcopy.com:80/
- Launched: March, 2007
- Current status: Offline

SharedCopy was an AJAX based web annotation tool that allowed users to mark-up, highlight, draw, annotate, cache, sticky-note, and share any website.

Founded in March 2007, SharedCopy was reviewed on TechCrunch, Lifehacker, Killer Startups, Startup Squad, and The Wall Street Journal. Initial user response to the system was mixed. Some reviews were positive, but others complained about bugs that were eventually fixed.

The co-founder of SharedCopy was also nominated by Businessweek for Asia's Young Entrepreneur 2007.
