= Third Voice =

Web annotation browser plug-in

- Release: 1999
- Operating system: Microsoft windows
- Type: web annotation
- License: Free

Third Voice was a web annotation browser plug-in launched in 1999 by a company of the same name. The motto associated with the plug-in was:Your Web. Your Voice.. The plug-in allowed users to use a sidebar to annotate web sites with note and view notes left by other users. A small red triangle indicated an annotation had been left by another party, these annotations not being held on the website itself but on Third Voice's own servers.

== History ==
The product encountered various problems in its short lifecycle. Initially when websites were visited there was often little content available from other Third Voice users. The product soon received much criticism by website owners claiming they were trying to externalize discussion. The White House website was annotated with topical jokes. Further issues arose when spammers began to leverage the product, and increased issues arose when cross-site scripting security vulnerabilities were exploited in the product.

A significant campaign Say No to Third Voice (SNTTV or Say No to TV) was raised against Third Voice.

== Discontinued ==
The company discontinued the product in April 2001.
