= Christopher D. Manning =

Australian-American computer scientist (born 1965)

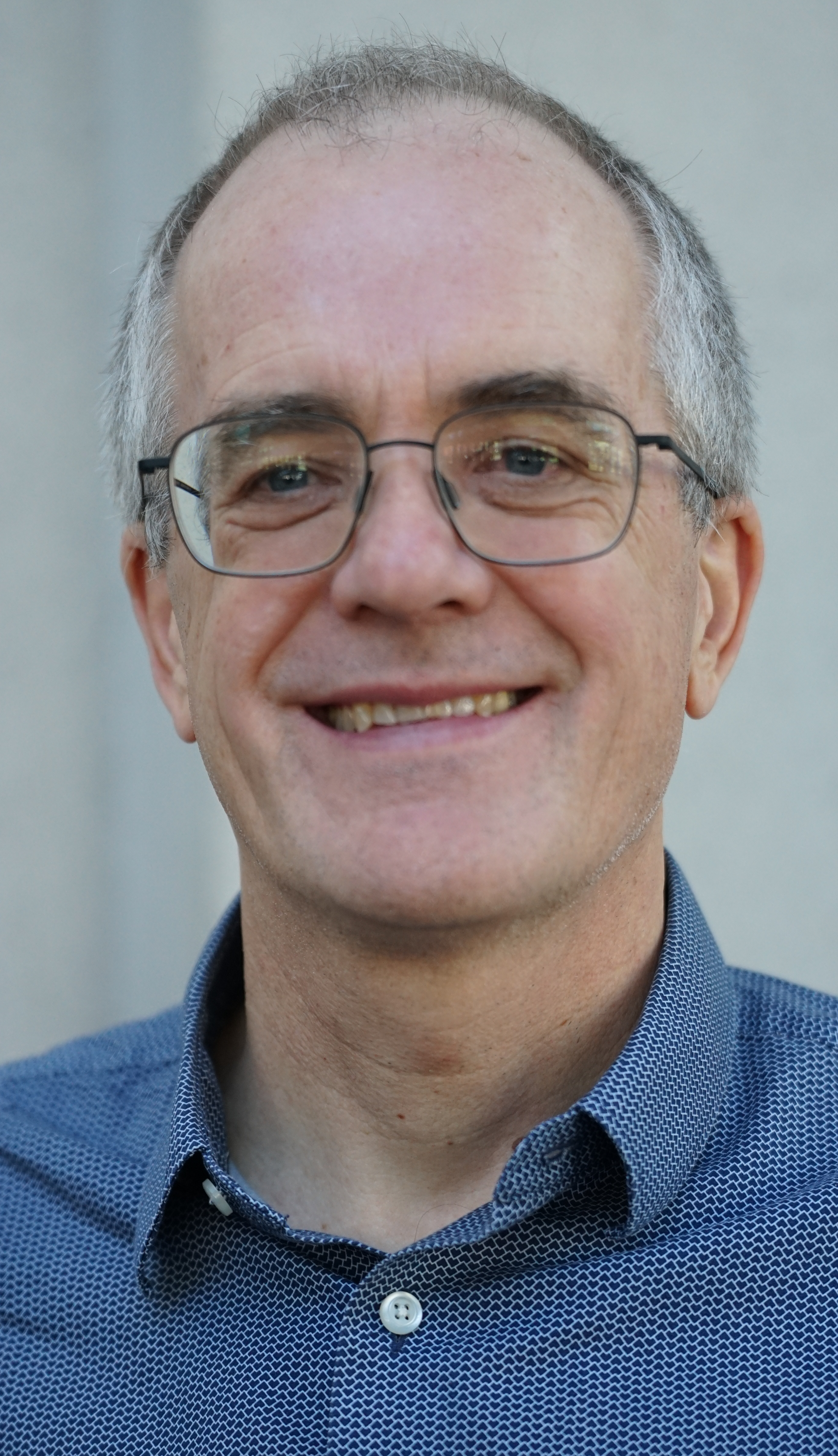
- Manning in 2025
- Awards: AAAI Fellow (2010); ACM Fellow (2013); IEEE John von Neumann Medal (2024); National Academy of Engineering (2025); American Academy of Arts and Sciences (2025)

Academic background
- Education: Australian National University (BA (Hons)); Stanford University (PhD)
- Thesis: Ergativity: Argument Structure and Grammatical Relations (1994)

Academic work
- Institutions: Carnegie Mellon University; University of Sydney; Stanford University
- Doctoral students: Dan Klein; Sepandar Kamvar; Danqi Chen

Christopher David Manning is an Australian-American computer scientist and applied linguist specialising in the areas of natural language processing, artificial intelligence, and machine learning. Manning is known for co-developing GloVe word vectors; the bilinear or multiplicative form of attention, now widely used in artificial neural networks including the transformer; tree-structured recursive neural networks; and approaches to and systems for textual entailment.

Manning is the inaugural Thomas M. Siebel Professor in Machine Learning, and a professor of linguistics and computer science at Stanford University. He has been the director of the Stanford Artificial Intelligence Laboratory since 2018.

== Early life and education ==
Christopher David Manning received a BA (Hons) degree majoring in mathematics, computer science, and linguistics from the Australian National University (1989). He earned a PhD in linguistics from Stanford University in California in 1994, under the guidance of Joan Bresnan.

== Career ==
Manning was an assistant professor at Carnegie Mellon University in Pittsburgh, Pennsylvania, from 1994 to 1996, followed by a sting as lecturer at the University of Sydney in Sydney, Australia, from 1996 to 1999. He returned to the US to take up a position as an assistant professor at Stanford, where he was promoted to associate professor in 2006 and to full professor in 2012.

Manning's PhD students include Dan Klein, Sepandar Kamvar, Richard Socher, and Danqi Chen.

As of 2026 he is inaugural Thomas M. Siebel Professor in Machine Learning (named for Thomas Siebel) and a professor of Linguistics and Computer Science at Stanford University, and was the director of the Stanford Artificial Intelligence Laboratory (SAIL) from 2018 to 2025.

On 1 October 2026 Manning was appointed as one of three expert commissioners to lead the Royal Commission into Artificial Intelligence established by the Government of South Australia.

== Work ==
Manning's linguistic work includes his dissertation "Ergativity: Argument Structure and Grammatical Relations" (1994), a monograph Complex Predicates and Information Spreading in LFG (1999), and his work developing Universal Dependencies, from which he is the namesake of Manning's Law.

He is known for co-developing GloVe word vectors; the bilinear or multiplicative form of attention, now widely used in artificial neural networks including the transformer; tree-structured recursive neural networks; and approaches to and systems for textual entailment. His main educational contributions are his textbooks Foundations of Statistical Natural Language Processing (1999) and Introduction to Information Retrieval (2008). From 2002, Manning also pioneered the development of well-maintained open source computational linguistics software packages, including CoreNLP, Stanza, and GloVe.

== Recognition and memberships ==
Manning was elected an AAAI Fellow in 2010, an inaugural ACL Fellow in 2011, and an ACM Fellow in 2013.

He was president of the Association for Computational Linguistics in 2015.

He received an honorary doctorate from the University of Amsterdam in 2023.

Manning was awarded the IEEE John von Neumann Medal "for advances in computational representation and analysis of natural language" in 2024 and elected as a Fellow of the National Academy of Engineering and the American Academy of Arts and Sciences in 2025.

== Bibliography ==
- Manning, Christopher David; Schütze, Hinrich (1999). Foundations of Statistical Natural Language Processing. Cambridge: Massachusetts Institute of Technology. ISBN 0-262-13360-1. OL 35843M. Wikidata Q115664565.
- Manning, Christopher David; Prabhakar Raghavan; Schütze, Hinrich (2008). Introduction to Information Retrieval. Cambridge University Press. doi:10.1017/cbo9780511809071. ISBN 978-0-511-80907-1. OL 34476084M. Zbl 1160.68008. Wikidata Q60673995.
