= A.nnotate =

- Website type: Social Annotations, Highlighting
- Creator: Textensor Limited
- Website: a.nnotate.com
- Commercial: Yes
- Launched: Jan 2008
- Current status: Inactive

A.nnotate is a discontinued web service for storing and annotating documents. It closed on 30th of November 2023 because it was no longer generating enough revenue to support the costs of maintaining it.

Documents were either uploaded by the user or fetched from a web address supplied by the user. Uploads were accepted as PDF, Microsoft Word, office formats supported by OpenOffice and common image formats. When a URL of a web page was entered, the service makes a local copy of the HTML and stylesheet. The service offered a browser bookmarklet to facilitate making snapshots of web pages.

Uploaded documents were rendered as images on the server, and the images were sent to the user's browser for display and annotation. Annotation with regions and arrows was supported for all documents. For text documents, the server also sent the positions of words on the page, allowing the client to offer text search and highlighting. Annotations could be displayed in the right-hand margin, as floating boxes above the text, or as footnotes. For web snapshots, they could also be displayed within the main text flow.

By default, all documents and annotations were private. A user could issue invitations by email to allow other users to view and annotate a particular document or to access all documents in a folder. A "reply" option on annotations allowed other users to comment on existing annotations, offering a form of Threaded discussion. Access controls allowed the document owner to specify what annotators may do, including viewing each other's annotations and defining new tags.

== A.nnotate development ==
Early development of A.nnotate was enabled by proof-of-concept funding to Textensor Limited, from the Scottish Government for a project on authoring structured content from text . The resulting software, "Notate" is described in a white paper from 2007 which included support for semantic web authoring.

In 2008 the company started selling standalone versions of the system for installation on local hardware and developed an API allowing web application developers and systems integrators to add annotation capabilities to existing document management systems. It offers off the shelf modules for integration with Documentum and Moodle.

== File formats and requirements ==
Documents were accepted as PDF, Microsoft Office formats, ODF formats and images as PNG, JPEG and GIF. The client browser required javascript and cookies to be enabled. A.nnotate could be used with Firefox, Internet Explorer (versions 6, 7, and 8), Safari or Google Chrome

== See also ==
- Web annotation
- List of PDF software
