= BEdita =

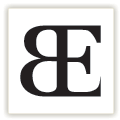
- Developer(s): ChannelWeb srl / Chialab srl
- Stable release: 5.41.0 / 30 June 2025; 40 days ago
- Repository: github.com/bedita/bedita
- Written in: PHP
- Operating system: Any
- Platform: Cross-platform
- Available in: English, Italian, German
- Type: Content Management System & Web development framework
- License: AGPLv3
- Website: www.bedita.com

BEdita is an open source web development framework that features a Content Management System (CMS) out-of-the-box.

Current version is 3.1.5, released on 5 March 2012 under Affero General Public License version 3.
A preview and "unstable" version is also available: 3.2.beta populus, released on 5 March 2012 under the same GPL license.

BEdita is built upon the PHP development framework CakePHP.

== Features ==
BEdita is both a content management system and a web development framework.

In the words of the authors, BEdita is a "modular framework that features a back-end Content Management System out-of-the-box".

=== Bedita as a Framework ===
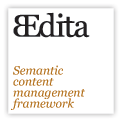
BEdita is a Semantic Content Management Framework.

BEdita is built upon the well-known PHP development framework CakePHP: as a framework itself, BEdita actually extends CakePHP adding many features through more controllers and helpers and the Smarty templating engine. It also combines some presentation technologies, such as JQuery, with the aim to supply a set of ready to use tools.

From CakePHP BEdita derives the Model–view–controller paradigm: the multi-tier architecture assures the separation of data modelling, data flow/control and its visual presentation. Inside BEdita every information is stored in an object oriented manner. Upon this abstraction, the developer can build as many custom relations as needed by the project.

=== Bedita as a CMS ===
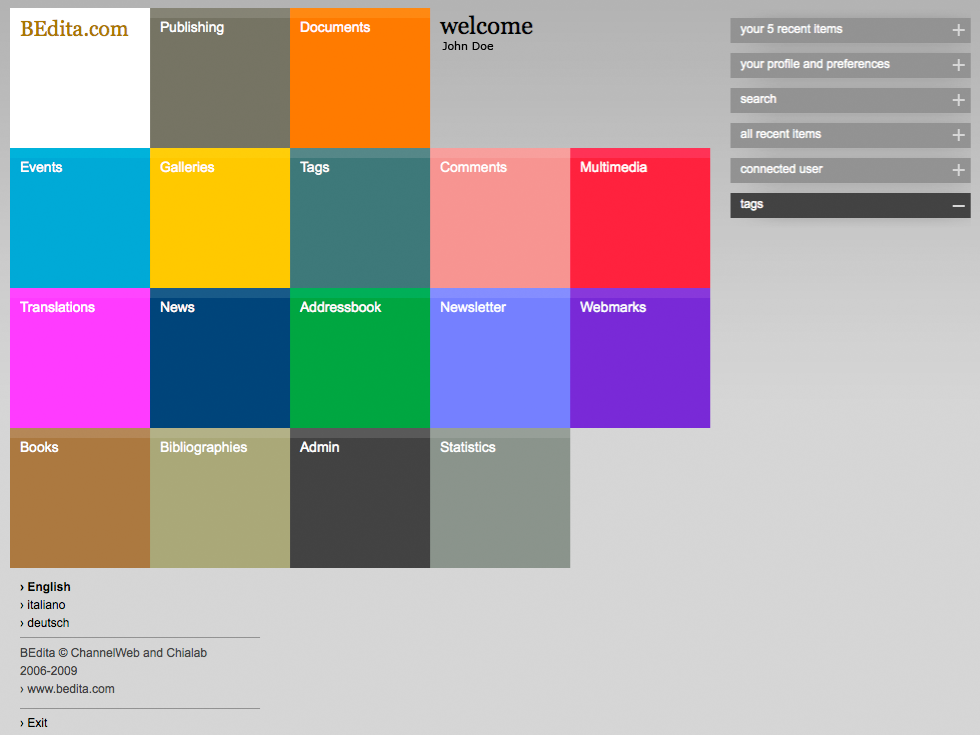
BEdita: a screenshot of the dashboard

BEdita is also a complete content management system, since it already comes with a multi-language back office application, able to manage several kinds of data: the CMS presents a number of modules, each related to a type of content. It is able to handle documents, multimedia objects and galleries, events, news, address books, blogs, bibliographies, newsletters and more out of the box.

All this content is managed in multiple languages, geo-localized and organized through different strategies: hierarchic tree, custom categories and tags.

== Releases ==
=== A brief history ===
For major release 3, BEdita has been rewritten from the ground up: all the previous versions were not publicly available under an open source license.

The very first public release of a version 3 "beta" took place in May 2009. On 17 November 2009 a stable version of BEdita – 3.0 codename Betula – was released under Affero General Public License version 3, freely downloadable on the official web site www.bedita.com and some common open-source online networks (SourceForge, Freshmeat or Ohloh).

BEdita was created and is currently developed by two Italian companies, ChannelWeb srl and Chialab srl.

=== List of public official releases ===
Versione	Code Name	Data	Note
3.0.beta2	NA	27 May 2009	first public release
3.0.beta3	NA	1 August 2009	
3.0 RC	Alnus	1 September 2009	
3.0	Betula	17 November 2009	first official stable release
3.01	Betula	12 January 2010	stable release (bug fixes and minor updates)
3.1.alpha	Ulmus	5 May 2010	unstable alpha release (bug fixes and new features)
3.1.beta	Ulmus	9 July 2010	unstable beta release (bug fixes and new features)
3.1.RC	Ulmus	20 August 2010	unstable RC release (bug fixes and new features)
3.1	Ulmus	7 December 2010	stable official release (bug fixes and new features)
3.1.1	Ulmus	1 February 2011	stable official release (bug fixes and new features)
3.1.2	Ulmus	1 February 2011	stable official release (bug fixes and new features)
3.1.3	Ulmus	16 June 2011	stable official release (bug fixes and new features)
3.1.4	Ulmus	31 October 2011	stable official release (bug fixes and new features)
3.1.5	Ulmus	5 March 2012	stable official release (bug fixes and new features)
3.2.beta	Populus	5 March 2012	unstable beta release (bug fixes and new features)

== See also ==
- Free Software licensing
- List of AGPL web applications
