= GetThere =

Corporate travel reservation system

GetThere, Inc.
- Formerly: Internet Travel Network (itn.net)
- Company type: Corporation (subsidiary)
- Industry: Online Corporate Travel
- Founded: 1995; 31 years ago
- Founder: Dan Whaley; Al Whaley; Bruce Yoxsimer
- Headquarters: Southlake, Texas
- Key people: Wade Jones, Executive Vice President & President, Sabre Travel Network
- Owner: Independent; (1995-2000); Sabre Corporation; (2000-25); Serko; (2025–present)
- Number of employees: 300 (2015)
- Website: getthere.com

GetThere is a corporate travel reservation system that is owned by Serko.

== History ==
GetThere first started in 1995 as a company named Internet Travel Network (itn.net) founded by Dan Whaley, Al Whaley and Bruce Yoxsimer. It changed its name to GetThere and went public on NASDAQ under the ticker GTHR in 1999 and was acquired by Sabre in August 2000 for $757 million.

Following the acquisition, the firm merged with the Sabre Business Travel Solutions system and became part of the Sabre Travel Network. The first airline reservation (SFO-LAS) ever made over the World Wide Web was made on June 5, 1995 through an ITN server in Palo Alto, CA.

In January 2025, it was announced that Serko had completed the purchase of GetThere for $12 million. However, it was reported that Sabre Corporation had become a partner in its former subsidiary.

== Products ==
GetThere's on-demand software as a service (SaaS) solutions include:

- GetThere: web and mobile solutions for corporate travel management. It includes corporate travel booking and reporting.
- GetThere Mobile for smartphones: mobile web application to check itinerary, book hotels, and book airfare.

== Current status ==
Used by thousands of companies in 95 countries, it is a global tool with SaaS-based architecture available in 16 languages and with more than 3,000 configurable site options. Serving large multinationals and mid-sized corporations, GetThere is visited by five million unique users per month to shop and book a business trip or meeting.

From 2000–2016, a GetThere customer was recognized with one of the Business Travel News Travel Manager of the Year or Best Practitioner awards.

In 2012, when it managed $9.6 billion in online corporate spending, it announced two new lines of business: Global Specialty Services, which includes benchmarking for corporate travel and procurement programs, and Sabre Virtual Meetings, a global reservation system for booking and scheduling public and corporate-owned high-definition video conferencing rooms.
