= Danqi Chen =

Chinese-American computer scientist

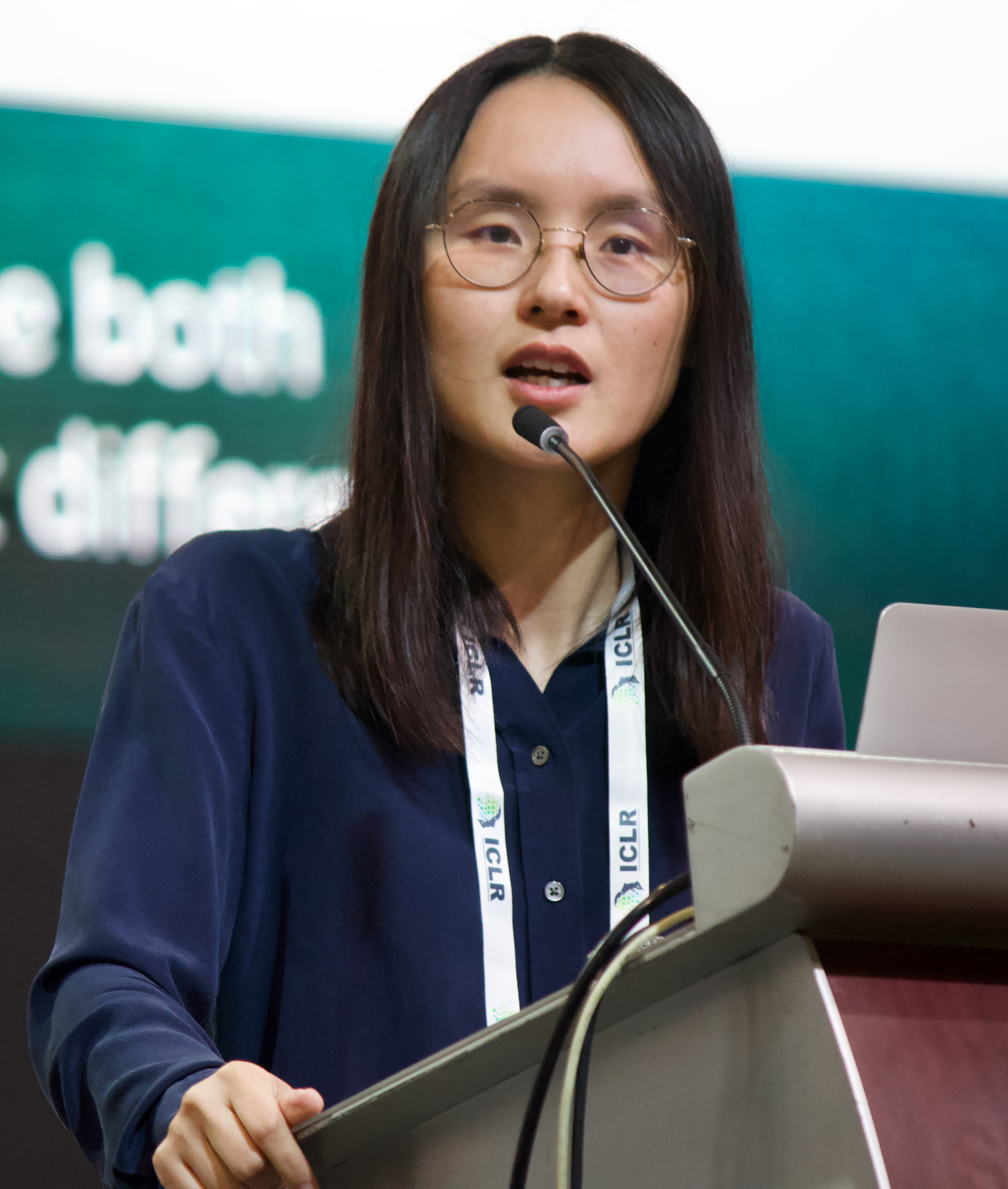
Chen at ICLR 2025

Danqi Chen (Chinese: 陈丹琦; pinyin: Chén Dānqí, IPA: [ʈ͡ʂʰə̌n tan t͡ɕʰǐ]; born in Changsha, China) is a Chinese computer scientist and assistant professor at Princeton University specializing in the AI field of natural language processing (NLP). In 2019, she joined the Princeton NLP group, alongside Sanjeev Arora, Christiane Fellbaum, and Karthik Narasimhan. She was previously a visiting scientist at Facebook AI Research (FAIR). She earned her Ph.D. at Stanford University and her BS from Tsinghua University.

Chen is the author of Neural Reading Comprehension and Beyond, a dissertation on using artificial intelligence to access knowledge in ordinary and structured documents. She is the author or co-author of a number of journal articles, including Reading Wikipedia to Answer Open-Domain Questions.

Google's SyntaxNet is based on algorithms developed by Danqi Chen and Christopher Manning at Stanford.

Her primary research interests are in text understanding and knowledge representation and reasoning.

She won a gold medal at the 2008 International Informatics Olympiad. She is known among friends as CDQ. A well known algorithm in competitive programming, CDQ Divide and Conquer, is named after this acronym.

She is married to Huacheng Yu, an assistant professor in theoretical computer science at Princeton University.
