= Searx =

Metasearch engine

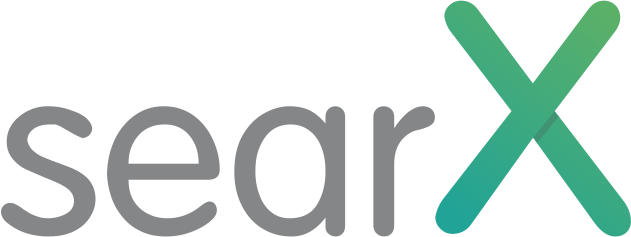

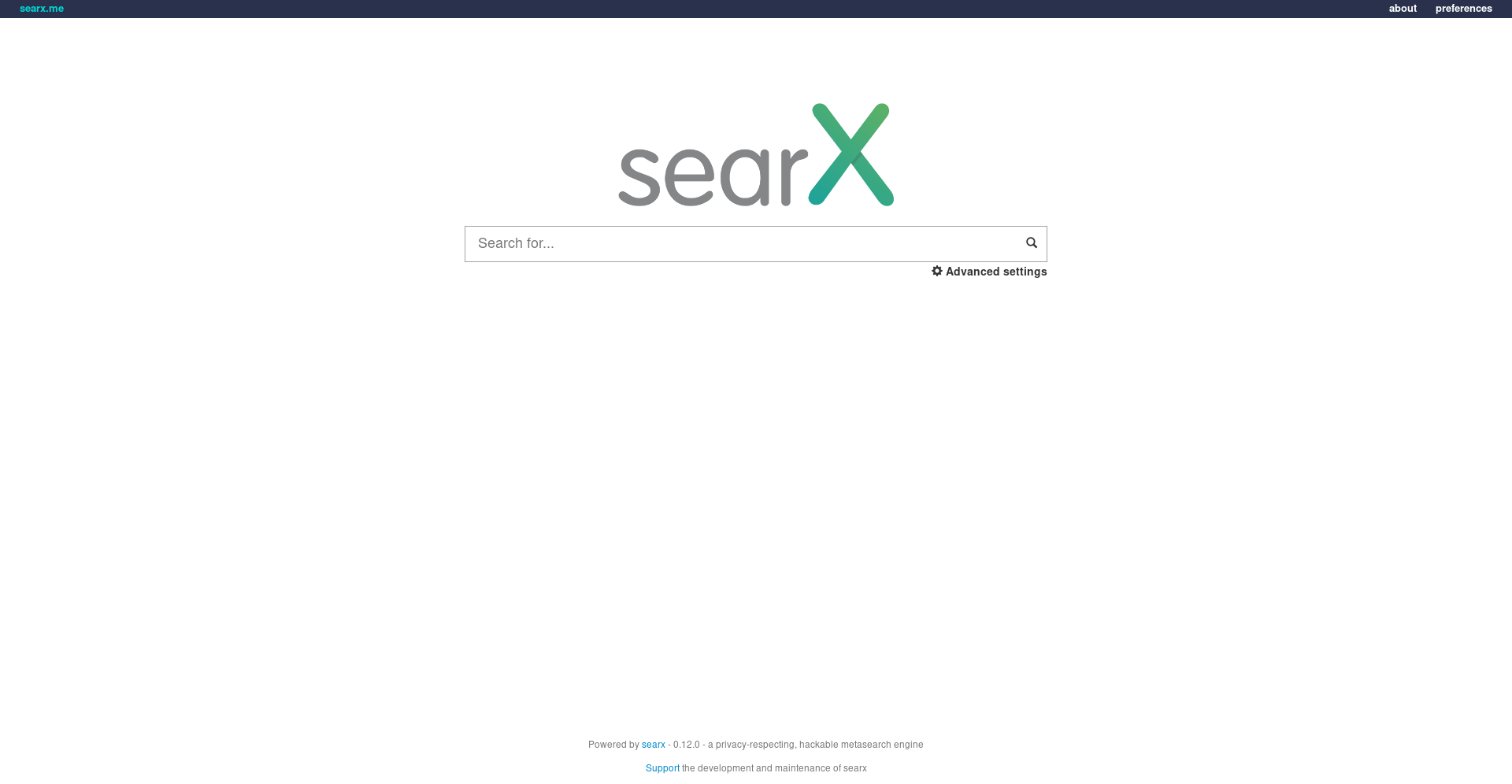
- Searx web interface
- Developer: Adam Tauber (alias asciimoo)
- Release: January 22, 2014; 12 years ago
- Stable release: 1.1.0 / 7 August 2022; 4 years ago
- Written in: Python
- Successor: SearXNG
- Type: Metasearch engine
- License: AGPL-3.0-or-later
- Website: searx.space (List of Searx instances; now lists SearXNG instances)
- Repository: github.com/searx/searx (archived)

Searx (/sɜːrks/; stylized as searX) is a discontinued free and open-source metasearch engine, available under the GNU Affero General Public License version 3, with the aim of protecting the privacy of its users. To this end, Searx does not share users' IP addresses or search history with the search engines from which it gathers results. Tracking cookies served by the search engines are blocked, preventing user-profiling-based results modification. By default, Searx queries are submitted via HTTP POST, (Note: Except on Chromium-based web browsers, where HTTP GET requests are used instead.) to prevent users' query keywords from appearing in webserver logs. Searx was inspired by the Seeks project, though it does not implement Seeks' peer-to-peer user-sourced results ranking.

Each search result is given as a direct link to the respective site, rather than a tracked redirect link as used by Google. In addition, when available, these direct links are accompanied by cached and/or proxied links that allow viewing results pages without actually visiting the sites in question. The cached links point to saved versions of a page on the Wayback Machine, while the proxied links allow viewing the current live page via a Searx-based web proxy. In addition to the general search, the engine also features tabs to search within specific domains: files, images, Information technology, maps, music, news, science, social media, and videos.

Users can run private instances of Searx on their own computer, but there are also many public, user-run, Searx instances, some of which are available as Tor hidden services. Meta-Searx instances can also be used to forward the search query to a random public instance. A public API is available for Searx, as well as Firefox search provider plugins.

As of 7 September 2023, the Searx GitHub repository has been archived, stating that SearX is no longer maintained. SearXNG, forked from Searx, maintains a repository.

== Search engines and other settings ==
Across all categories, Searx can fetch search results from about 82 different engines. This includes major search engines and site-specific searches like Bing, Google, Reddit, Wikipedia, Yahoo, and Yandex. The engines used for each search category can be set via a "preferences" interface, and these settings will be saved in a cookie in the user's web browser, rather than on the server side, since for privacy reasons, Searx does not implement a user login model. Other settings such as the search interface language and the search results language (over 20 languages are available) can be set the same way.

In addition to the preferences cookie, it is possible on each query to modify the engines used, search categories selected, and/or languages to search in by specifying one or more of the following textual search operators before the search keywords.

- !category — Search the specified category instead of the default ones.
- ?category — Search the specified category in addition to the default ones.
- !engine — Search the specified engine instead of the default ones.
- ?engine — Search the specified engine in addition to the default ones.
- :language — Search for results in the specified language instead of the default one.

The ! and ? operators can be specified more than once to select multiple categories or engines, for example !google !deviantart ?images :japanese cow.

== Instances ==
Any user may run their own instance of Searx, which can be done to maximize privacy, avoid congestion on public instances, preserve customized settings (even if browser cookies are cleared), allow auditing of the source code being run, and more. Users may include their Searx instances on the editable list of all public instances, or keep them private. It is also possible to add custom search engines to a self-hosted instance that are not available on the public instances. In 2019, Google has begun to block some self-hosted instances. This included some of the IP addresses used by searx.me from queries that result in a google (unexpected crash: CAPTCHA required) error. In response, some instances have been modified to silently skip trying to search with Google even when it's the only engine specified.

== SearXNG fork ==
SearXNG-wordmark

In the middle of 2021, some contributors of SearX forked the repo to SearXNG with a view to provide faster debugging and fixes of engine errors. SearXNG is for users that need a faster upstream development time with fewer bugs. User theme, engine reliability and anonymous metrics are the most notable changes in SearXNG.

== See also ==
- List of meta search engines
- Comparison of web search engines
- Search engine privacy
