= Evercam =

Closed-circuit television software application

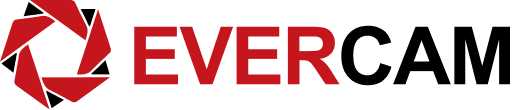
- Written in: Python
- Operating system: Linux
- Available in: English
- Type: Surveillance
- License: AGPL
- Website: https://evercam.io/
- Repository: github.com/evercam/

Evercam is an open-source, closed-circuit television software application designed to be run as SaaS. Uses of the software include security, supply chain monitoring, time-lapse photography, and enterprise resource planning integrations.

Evercam is a global technology company that provides a cloud-based platform for real-time visual monitoring and data capture of construction sites. The software integrates fixed and mobile cameras, drones, 360-degree imagery, and Building Information Modeling (BIM) data to record and document site activity. Its tools are used to track construction progress, communicate between teams, and record conditions such as delays or weather events.

== History ==
Evercam was founded in Dublin in 2010 by Marco Herbst and Vinnie Quinn, who had previously co-founded the employment website Nixers.com (later renamed Jobs.ie), which was acquired by Saongroup in 2005 for €2.5 million. Before establishing Evercam, the founders developed a Cloud CCTV, known as Camba TV, which sought to provide camera access via the cloud. Evercam originated as a proprietary VSaaS application by Camba.tv Ltd, who published the source code to the public under the Affero General Public License (AGPL) licence in April 2015. By the mid-2010s, the Evercam platform had focused on construction and industrial projects such as supplying time-lapse and monitoring cameras to large building sites.

In 2013, Evercam was accepted into Telefónica's Wayra accelerator and also received backing from Enterprise Ireland and private investors. In early 2014, Evercam secured a €500,000 funding round to support the development of its camera management platform. Evercam also raised €600,000 in funding from investors including DBIC Ventures, Elkstone Ventures, and Enterprise Ireland in 2020. By that time, the company operated in Ireland, the United Kingdom, Australia, the United States, Pakistan, Algeria, Poland, and Canada.

In October 2022, the company raised €8.9 million in a funding round led by Knocknagore Capital.

In 2023 Evercam has added AI-driven analytics: its software can apply machine-learning algorithms to video feeds to recognize objects, count people or vehicles, and generate reports on site activity.

In 2024, Evercam received a Bentley Partner Excellence Award in the “Rapid Time to Value” category for integrating 4D camera footage with building information modeling (BIM) through features such as live view, streaming, time-lapse, and project management tools.

== Operations ==
Evercam earns revenue by providing the software as a service, a business model that is increasingly common amongst open-source companies. It is primarily used for monitoring construction sites, infrastructure projects, and industrial facilities. The system provides verifiable documentation of worksites, which can be used for project management, marketing, and dispute resolution.

Evercam is based in Dublin, Ireland with locations in London (UK), Verona (USA), Melbourne (Australia) and Singapore. Marco Herbst is the CEO of the company.

== Features ==
Evercam provides a RESTful web API and an apps framework for camera streams, enabling developers to add functions such as automated timelapse or scheduled snapshots. Key features of Evercam include remote live view, scheduled image recording, and automatic timelapse video generation. The platform supports digital zoom and image annotation tools for site photos. It also provides project-documentation aids, such as “Progress Photosl” function that captures key site images and emails them to stakeholders on a schedule, and a comparison tool overlays “before and after” shots to verify progress. Evercam AI analytics software can recognize objects, count people or vehicles, and generate reports on site activity.

Evercam integrates with many construction and enterprise systems, including project-management and BIM platforms (such as Procore, Autodesk BIM 360, Bentley iTwin), data tools (e.g. Microsoft Power BI, SharePoint), and ERP/business software (Oracle NetSuite allowing users to attach camera snapshots to NetSuite transactions.

== See also ==
- Closed-circuit television (CCTV)
- Closed-circuit television camera
- IP camera
- Zoneminder Open Source Surveillance Software
