= SearXNG =

Metasearch engine

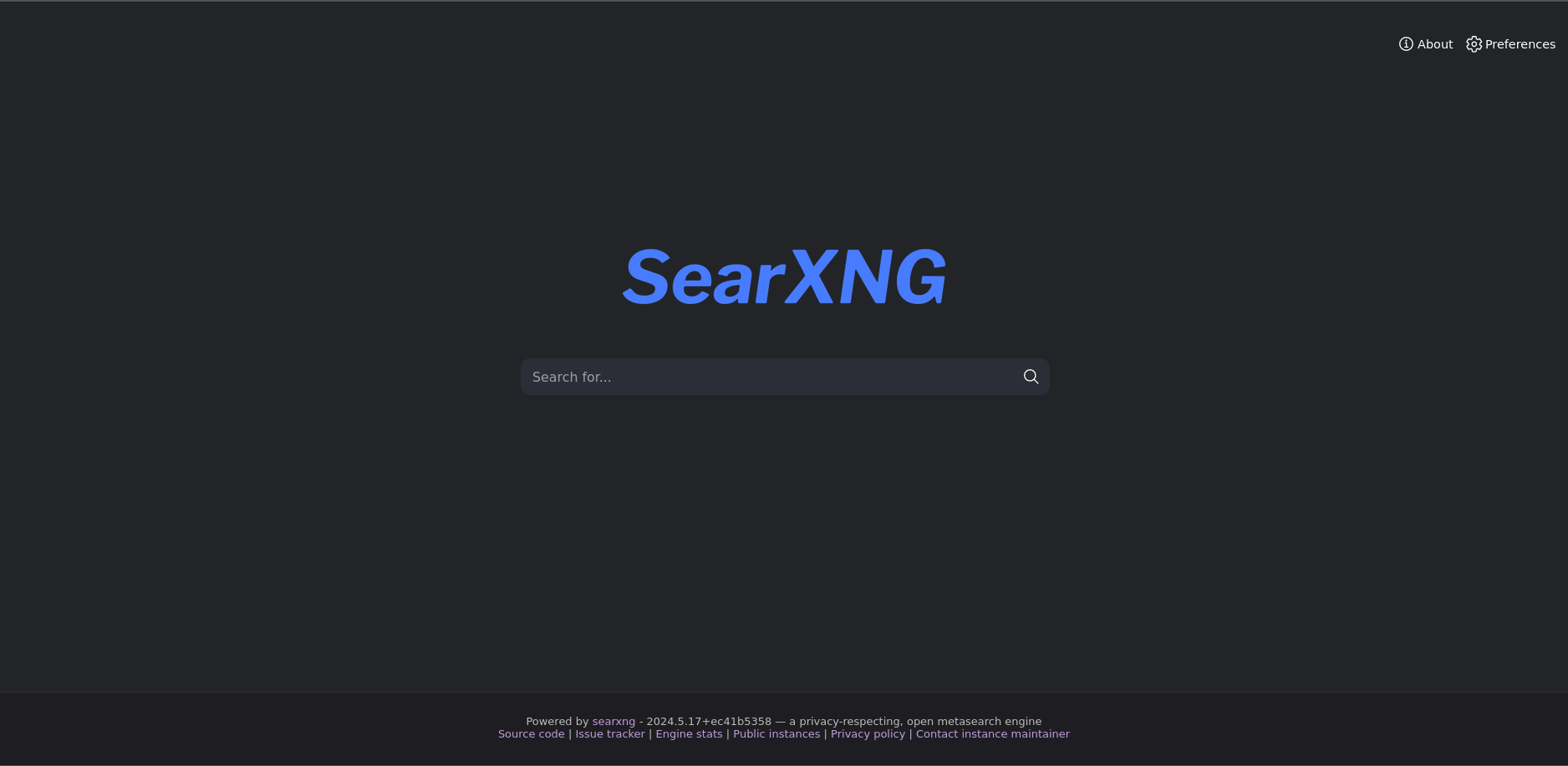
- SearXNG home page with the default dark theme
- Release: March 27, 2021; 5 years ago
- Written in: Python, HTML
- Operating system: Linux, FreeBSD, macOS
- Predecessor: searX
- Standard: OpenSearch
- Type: Metasearch engine
- License: GNU Affero General Public License
- Website: docs.searxng.org (documentation) searx.space (public instances)
- Repository: github.com/searxng/searxng

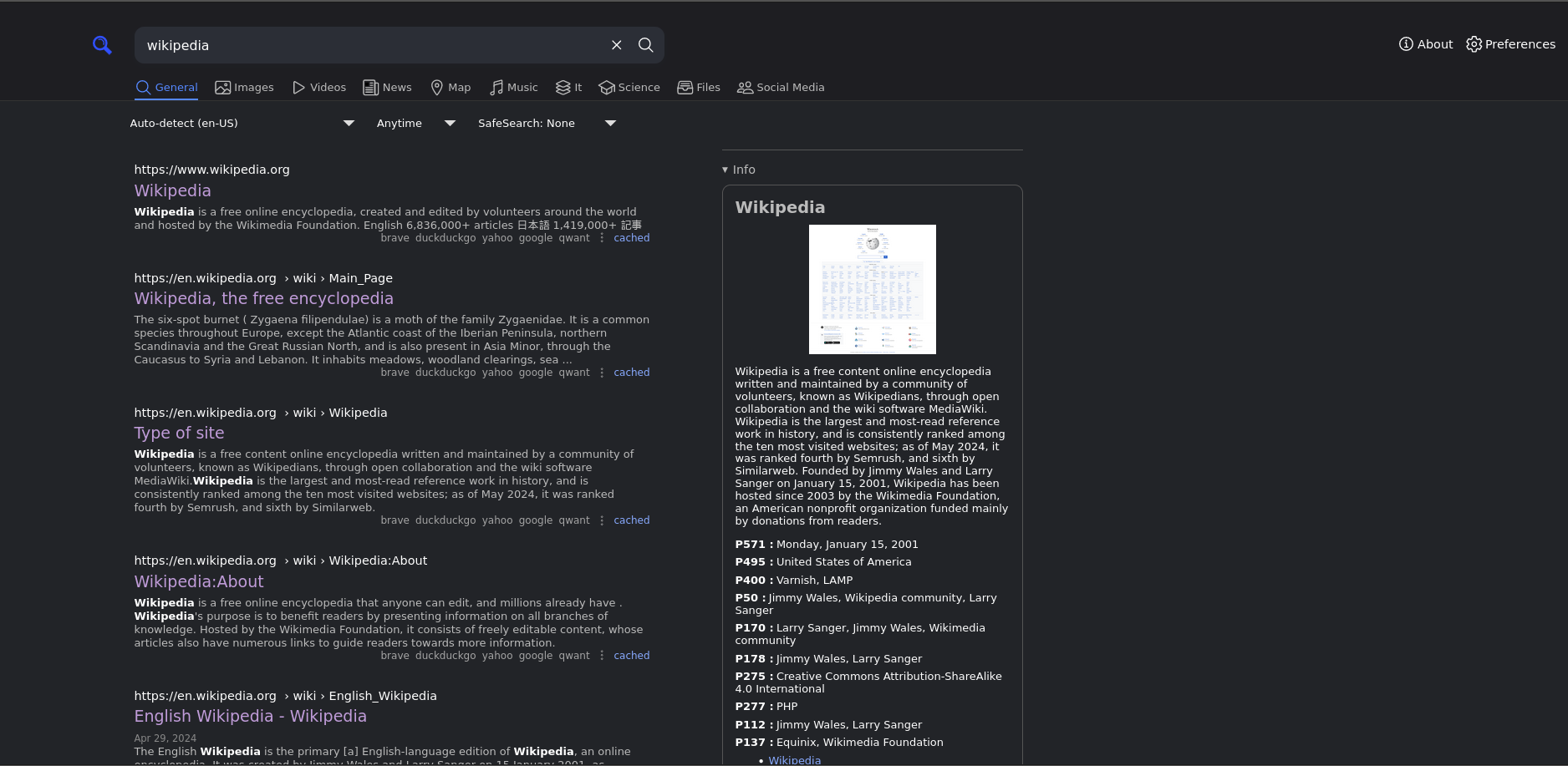
The SearXNG results page with "wikipedia" as the search term

SearXNG is a metasearch engine forked from the discontinued searX. It is free and open-source and, similarly to searX, does not collect information about users.

== Instances ==
SearXNG is server-side software, and as such is hosted by several instances, public and private. Private instances are hosted on a local network, or run on the user's desktop computer itself, and are designed to be used by one person or a small number of people. Public instances are hosted on public web servers and are designed to be used by anyone like a typical search engine. A list of public instances is available at searx.space.

== Features ==
=== Categorical searching ===
SearXNG can separate results into multiple categories, including the standard categories of "General, "Images," "Videos," and "News," as well as the non-standard categories of "Social Media," "Music," "Files," "IT," and "Science."

=== Engines ===
As a metasearch engine, SearXNG functions by sending queries to upstream search engines and returning them to the user. As of 2023, more than 70 different search engines are supported, including Google, Bing, DuckDuckGo, and Qwant. As of 2026, SearXNG lists 251 possible search services to search from. SearXNG also supports "bangs", searching only a particular engine if an exclamation point and shortcut key are appended before the search. Using two exclamation marks, such as "!!w", functions like DuckDuckGo's version of bangs, redirecting to the external engine itself.

=== Privacy ===
SearXNG removes private data from requests sent to search services. SearXNG itself stores little to no information that can be used to identify users. Some search engines are based in the United States, which makes law enforcement requests for user data to US-based digital services; any information stored on a SearXNG engine based outside the US is not affected.
