= Perusall =

Web annotation tool

Perusall is a social web annotation tool intended for use by students at schools and universities. It allows users to annotate the margins of a text in a virtual group setting that is similar to social media—with upvoting, emojis, chat functionality, and notification. It also includes automatic AI grading.

== History ==
Perusall began as a research project at Harvard University. It later became an educational product for students and teachers.

As of 2024, Perusall states more than 5 million students have used the tool at over 5,000 educational institutions in 112 countries.

== Functionality ==
Perusall integrates with learning management systems such as Moodle, Canvas, and Blackboard to aid with collaborative annotation.

The tool supports annotation of a range of media including text, images, equations, videos, PDFs, and snapshots of webpages.
