= Co-ment =

Online word processor

co-ment / COMT

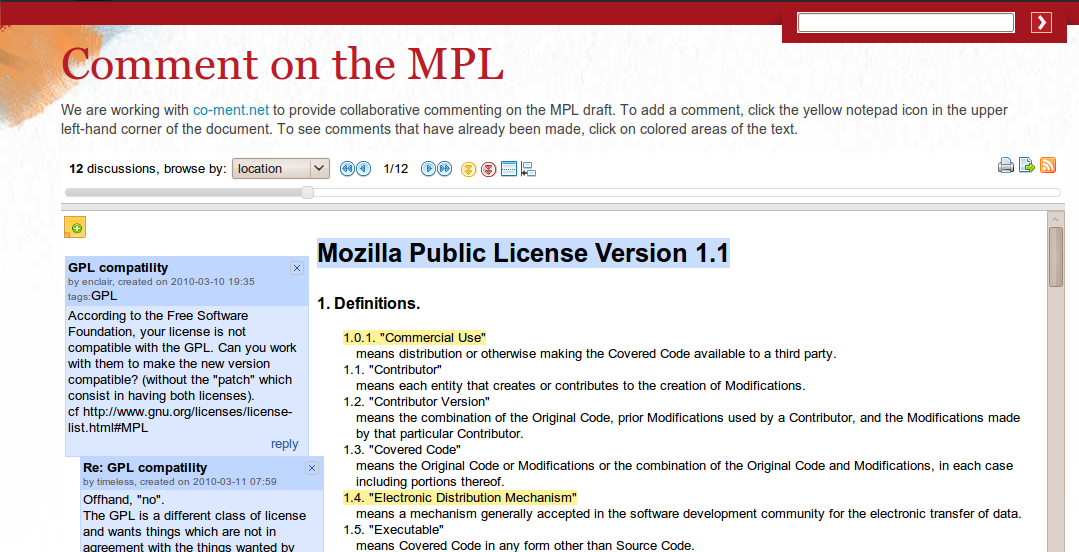
- Screenshot Revision 1.1 of Mozilla Public License done via co-ment
- Original author: Philippe Aigrain
- Final release: 2.6.4 / 10 February 2016; 10 years ago
- Written in: Python/Django
- Available in: English, French
- Type: Online word processor
- License: AGPL
- Website: co-ment.org
- Repository: github.com/co-ment/comt

co-ment / COMT is a (no longer maintained) online word processor allowing collaborative writing and commenting. It was inspired by the software package stet, which was created to handle the GNU GPL version 3 online revision. It is free software, available under Affero GPL.

== Description ==
Co-ment allows groups of users to collaboratively elaborate online texts. It offers a wiki-style editing environment, supporting many syntaxes, and allows some finely controlled layouts, including table or images.

Its main interest is its comment feature, allowing users to attach their remarks to specific extracts of text, leading to a text building procedure based on strong and equipped debates.

Advanced comment navigation features are also provided to help discover new annotations or go through the history of a debate. It's also possible to set up email alerts on text edits or new comments.

Co-ment is fitted with many import/export formats support: TXT, DOC, ODT, HTML. Co-ment has a special focus on layout in respect of exported file types.

== Sources ==
It is available as a free web service, extended by pro accounts following the WordPress model. Source code is available on the Co-ment website, and it's also bundled as a Drupal module.

== Usages ==
Some of the greatest use cases of co-ment are for education, in particular first language and literature teaching in secondary education.

Co-ment is inspired by stet, the tool created to handle the online revision of the GPL v3, and has been since used for other licenses such as the Mozilla Public License and the Creative Commons licence family.

Co-ment is also used for legal works, for administrative works and for advocacy works.
