= Stet (software) =

Software package

stet
- Repository: github.com/greenrd/stet
- Type: Web application
- License: AGPL

stet is a free software package for gathering comments about a text document via a webpage. The initial version was developed from late 2005 until mid-2006 by the Software Freedom Law Center as a service to its client, the Free Software Foundation (FSF). The software was built to facilitate public consultation during the Version 3 draft process of the GNU General Public License.

== History ==
To comment on a document hosted in stet, the user must select a few words or a sentence from the text and anchor their comment to that specific text. This requirement, it was hoped, would increase the specificity and relevance of comments. Also, all the previous comments are visible to each new user. Heavily commented-on parts are highlighted by light to dark color-coding of the text according to the number of the comments.

The name ‘stet’ is a reference to the proofreading annotation meaning “let it stand”. This annotation is used to undo previous hand-written editing instructions in a manuscript, leaving the resultant text as originally submitted.

stet is implemented in JavaScript, XSLT and Perl, using parts of Request Tracker. The initial development was managed by Bradley M. Kuhn, CTO of the SFLC, and implemented by Orion Montoya who was on a one-year contract with the SFLC. The only known deployment of stet to date is available at the GPLv3 Draft Process site, gplv3.fsf.org.

On 21 November 2007, Kuhn announced that SFLC released stet under the Affero General Public License, making stet the first program known to have been used in the generation of its own software license.

As of 2009, stet is not actively developed. co-ment is software with very similar functionality, but written in Python/Django, and developed by Sopinspace, the firm of SFLC director Philippe Aigrain.

== See also ==
- Web annotation
