= Tomas Laurenzo =

Uruguayan artist

- Born: 1977 (age 48–49); Uruguay
- Known for: New media art, Artificial intelligence art

Academic background
- Education: University of the Republic (Uruguay)
- Thesis: Decoupling and context in new media art
- Doctoral advisor: Alvaro Casinelli

Academic work
- Institutions: University of Colorado Boulder; Microsoft Research; The Broad Institute of MIT and Harvard; City University of Hong Kong
- Website: https://laurenzo.net/

Tomas (Tom) Laurenzo Coronel (Montevideo, 1977) is an Uruguayan artist, engineer, computer scientist, academic, musician, writer, and designer. With a wide range of artistic practices and research interests, Laurenzo's productions often reflect on new technologies, art, and the politics of meaning.

== Career ==
Tomas Laurenzo received a BSc degree in computer science (CS) from University of the Republic (UdelaR) followed by MSc and PhD degrees in CS from PEDECIBA, a joint program by UdelaR and Uruguay's Ministry of Education and Culture. His doctoral advisor was Alvaro Cassinelli from University of Tokyo.

During his tenure in the private sector, Laurenzo led the design and development of Uruguay's first governmental internet portal and Uruguay's first publicly accessible governmental database.

After completing his first graduate program, Laurenzo's focus shifted from industry to art and education, where he contributed to Uruguay's academic, artistic, and research landscapes. He subsequently held the position of assistant professor at University of the Republic, where he founded and directed Uruguay's first research group on new media and human-computer interaction (HCI), followed by UdelaR's first Interdisciplinary Group on HCI research (NICHI).

NICHI's research conducted to developing alternative interaction methods for the computers used in the One Laptop Per Child (OLPC) program, allowing the inclusion of children with disabilities.

During his years at UdelaR he also advised the first two MSc theses on new media art and exhibited both small and large-scale interactive artworks. Some of these projects led to Laurenzo receiving some of the first-ever international awards for new media art in Uruguay. In 2011 he was awarded the Microsoft Research Fellowship Award.

Laurenzo relocated to Hong Kong in 2014 to assume the role of assistant professor at the School of Creative Media, City University of Hong Kong, under the leadership of the Australian new media artist Jeffrey Shaw.

In 2018 he was nominated for “On the Road”, the unique annual project initiated in 2014 by the Guan Shanyue Art Museum. That year, for the first time, the annual On the Road exhibition was dedicated to New Media Art.

Since 2021, Laurenzo holds the position of associate professor of Critical Media Practices at the College of Communication, Media, Design, and Information at the University of Colorado Boulder.

Laurenzo has also held positions as visiting scientist at the Broad Institute of Harvard and MIT, research fellow at Microsoft Research, visiting scholar at Carnegie Mellon University, guest lecturer at Brunel University London, and visiting artist at University of Iowa, among others.

== Artistic Production ==
Laurenzo's interest in social, political and philosophical topics are often noticeable in his art. Examples include the artworks 5500, Nibia, Be water, Homs and Smile, which explore the topics of illegal immigration, the death by torture of Nibia Sabalsagaray, the 2019–2020 Hong Kong protests, the Siege of Homs, and the destruction of the Gaza Strip, respectively.

Since 2024 his production has focused on the exploration of GenerativeAI art and it's aesthetic and social implications. Laurenzo was awarded first place in the inaugural Colorado State AI Art Competition. As a result, his artwork is now part of the permanent art collection of the Town of Superior in Colorado.

The UNESCO Chair in Human Rights and Human Security for the University of the Republic exhibited during June 2025, Laurenzo's artwork Ave Imperator at the National School of Fine Arts.

Laurenzo has performed or exhibited at Ars Electronica, SIGGRAPH, SIGGRAPH Asia, NIME, ISEA, NeurIPS, ECCV, Sónar+D, MUTEK, TEI, C3A, NYIT, ECCV, Osage Gallery, ANTEL, EAC, UdelaR, MSR, Presidency of Uruguay, Saatchi & Saatchi, Guggenheim Museum Bilbao, Goethe Institut, International Computer Music Conference, K11 Art Foundation, MNAV, Montevideo Exhibition Center, City Theatre, Chapelle des Bernardines, and the Solís Theatre, among others.

== Partial list of exhibited artworks ==
- Laurenzo, Tomas, Montevideo, 1983. Generative Video. “Monte Video Digital”.
- Laurenzo, Tomas, Abandoned Future. Generative AI.
- Laurenzo, Tomas, Ave Imperator. Generative Video. UNESCO Chair in Open Education at the University of the Republic. 2025. National School of Fine Arts.
- Laurenzo, Tomas, Hommage Numérique. Generative Video
- Laurenzo, Tomas. Smile. Interactive Installation.
- Laurenzo, Tomas. Be Water. Interactive Installation.
- Laurenzo, Tomas and Katia Vega BOX. Interactive Installation.
- Laurenzo, Tomas. Extraordinary Accident. Virtual Reality Installation.
- Laurenzo, Tomas. Memoirs of the Blind. Interactive Installation.
- Laurenzo, Tomas. Ekphrasis. Kinetic Installation.
- Laurenzo, Tomas. Traces.
- Laurenzo, Tomas. Simple Background Noise: Movement and Stillness. Sound art.
- Laurenzo, Tomas. ELLOS. Audio-visual performance.
- Laurenzo, Tomas. Homs. Installation.
- Laurenzo, Tomas, Tobias Klein and Christian Clark. The Blind Spot. Virtual reality performance.
- Laurenzo, Tomas and Tobias Klein. The Vision Machine. Audio-visual and mixed reality performance.
- Laurenzo, Tomas. Two Systems. Interactive Installation.
- Laurenzo, Tomas, Christian Clark et al. Barcelona.
- Laurenzo, Tomas, Tobias Klein and Christian Clark. Awkward Consequence. Virtual reality performance.
- Laurenzo, Tomas. Walrus. Interactive Installation.
- Laurenzo, Tomas and Tony Tackling. Elephant. Audio-visual performance.
- Laurenzo, Tomas. 5500. Audio-visual performance.
- Laurenzo, Tomas. Foreign Helpers. Interactive Installation.
- Laurenzo, Tomas et al. Lituania Lituania. Audio-visual performance.
- Laurenzo, Tomas, Christian Clark, et al. Celebra.
- Laurenzo, Tomas, Roger Dannenberg, and Adeline Lecce. Critical Point. Audio-visual performance.
- Laurenzo, Tomas. Son. Interactive Installation.
- Laurenzo, Tomas, Christian Clark, and Guillermo Berta. Net. Audio-visual performance.
- Laurenzo, Tomas, Marcelo Vidal, and Renaud Blanch. Ilumina. Interactive Installation.
- Laurenzo, Tomas. Ribbons 2.0. Audio-visual performance.
- Laurenzo, Tomas. Sino. Installation.
