= Adobe Acrobat version history =

Computer software history

The following article is about Adobe Acrobat's version history.

== Acrobat ==
==== Adobe Acrobat and Reader ==== Adobe Acrobat and Reader
Version	Release date	Notes	OS	Features
1.0	15 June 1993	Acrobat Reader priced originally at $50 per user.	DOS/Mac	
2.0	September 1994	First version for Microsoft Windows	Windows, Mac, SunOS, Solaris, HP-UX, IRIX, AIX, OS/2	Acrobat Catalog, which creates searchable indexes for PDF files; Adobe also released the first Acrobat Plug-ins SDK; allowing third-party developers to create plug-in programs for the Acrobat Exchange application.
3.0	November 1996	Last version for Windows 3.1x	Windows, Macintosh, SunOS, Solaris, HP-UX, IRIX, AIX, Digital UNIX, Linux, OS/2	
4.0	April 1999	Last version for Windows NT 3.51 and Mac OS 7.1.2 - 8.5	Windows, Macintosh, Solaris, HP-UX, IRIX, AIX, Linux	Support for PDF version 1.3
5.0	May 2001	Last version for Windows 95, Mac OS 8.6 and Mac OS 9.0.4 - 9.2.2	Windows, Macintosh, Solaris, HP-UX, AIX, Linux	Support for PDF version 1.4
6.0	July 2003	Adobe Acrobat Reader was renamed to Adobe Reader. Version 6 was criticized for its performance. The Acrobat 6 plug-ins for web browsers were also criticized for suffering from bad performance and potentially rendering one's web browser non-responsive. Last version for Windows 98 and Windows Me.	Windows, Macintosh, Linux, Solaris, HP-UX, AIX	Support for PDF version 1.5
7.0	28 December 2004	The first version to include a mandatory product activation.	Windows, Macintosh, Linux, Solaris, HP-UX, AIX	It included: Support for PDF version 1.6; Support for Adobe Policy Server rights management; Support for embedded 3D object information from the .u3d Universal 3D format; Adobe Acrobat 7 Professional for Windows now includes Adobe LiveCycle Designer 7.0. Adobe Elements 7.0 was also released which was still only sold by volume licensing outlets but decreased the minimum licenses limit to 100 licenses. Finally, another edition of Adobe Acrobat, Acrobat 3D, was added to the set. Adobe Acrobat 3D included all of the functionality of Acrobat Professional 7.0 as well as updated assistance for embedded 3D computer graphics, tools for capturing 3D content from OpenGL applications, and the Adobe Acrobat 3D Toolkit for converting CAD documents to PDF objects. Also included is a version of the capture tool for installation on Unix systems. Last version for Windows NT 4.0, though with limited feature support.
8.0	3 November 2006	A later update 8.1 in June 2007 was released in order to be compatible with Microsoft Office 2007 and 64-bit Windows operating systems. Also during September 2007, Adobe Reader 8.1.1 released for Linux and Solaris (SPARC) users. The Adobe Acrobat 8 set had a few changes. Acrobat 3D was now able to produce embedded PRC file format, a very compressed format for geometry and graphics which requires Reader 8.1 to display. It also supported Product Manufacturing Information and a number of different CAD formats. Acrobat Connect Professional (formerly Macromedia Breeze) was also added to the set. It allowed scalable interactive web conferencing and multiple personal meeting rooms for everyone part of an enterprise. The Mac OS X version of Adobe Acrobat Pro was improved significantly: Adobe Acrobat for Macintosh was made a Universal binary that operated on both PPC and Intel architectures. 8.x product support ended in November 2011.	Windows, Macintosh, Linux, Solaris, HP-UX, AIX	Support for PDF version 1.7; Acrobat 8 Elements, which was withdrawn before its expected release during mid-2007; Acrobat Connect (formerly Macromedia Breeze), a support application with online personal meeting rooms to collaborate in real time with as many as 15 participants
9.0	June 2, 2008	Adobe Acrobat 9.0 was released. Support for version 9 ended June 26, 2013, with the last available update being 9.5.5. Adobe Acrobat 9.5.5 is the very last version, which can be installed on Unix-based system. Therefore 10 years after release Adobe Acrobat 9.5.5 is still in use. Adobe Reader 9 ends compatibility with Adobe Reader Extensions 5 and 6 which permit Adobe Reader client software to save changes to filled-in forms in PDFs. Adobe Reader Extensions 6.1 and newer are still usable. Legacy PDFs will still be viewable, however they will open with the warning "This document enables Reader capabilities that are no longer enabled in this Reader version." The Adobe Acrobat 9 set also omitted the multiple document interface. Previous versions of Adobe Acrobat activated multiple PDF files in the same window (except for version 8 where MDI was only an alternative option and the default mode SDI). Acrobat 9 however, only uses the single document interface scheme, wherein each PDF file is activated in an instance of Adobe Acrobat. Last version for Windows 2000, PowerPC-based Macintosh PCs and any Unix-based-system.	Windows, Macintosh, Linux, Solaris, HP-UX, AIX	Support for PDF version 1.7; Support for Adobe extensions for PDF 1.7; The ability to create Acrobat forms was in Acrobat Standard, which was previously only available with Acrobat Professional 6, 7 and 8; Support for real-time collaboration on PDF files with synchronized document views and chat; Improved Web Capture for copying entire web pages or just some parts into PDF; Integration with Acrobat.com to enable storage and sharing of PDF files; Support for comparing and highlighting the differences between two versions of a PDF document; Support for playback of Flash Video or H.264 video in Adobe Acrobat and Adobe Reader; Support for conversion of a variety of video formats to Flash Video for playback inside PDF; Support for creating PDF maps by importing geospatial files that retain metadata and coordinates; Support for Optical character recognition (OCR) on PDF files using ClearScan. Adobe ClearScan technology creates and embeds custom Type1-CID fonts to match the visual appearance of a scanned document after optical character recognition. ClearScan uses these newly created custom fonts instead of system fonts or Type1-MM; The Adobe Acrobat 9 set includes a new program: Adobe Acrobat 9 Pro Extended for Microsoft Windows. This product includes Adobe Presenter as well as the features of Acrobat 3D.
10.0	November 15, 2010	Support by Adobe ended November 15, 2015. Version 10 introduced Protected Mode, a sandbox that employed features and techniques previously in use by Google Chrome and Microsoft Office 2010 to help mitigate or prevent potentially malicious content from affecting users' files or settings. In later Windows versions, Protected Mode is implemented as a low integrity process to further restrict the sandbox, and User Interface Privilege Isolation is used to thwart keystroke logging processes that operate at a higher integrity level. Adobe Reader X is available for Windows, Mac OS, Android, and iOS. Compatibility with Linux was never planned, why Unix-Users are stuck with 9.5.5.	Windows/Mac	
11.0	October 15, 2012	Support by Adobe ended October 15, 2017. The graphical user interface for desktop systems is carried over from version 10. Last version for Windows XP, Windows Server 2003, Windows Vista, Windows Server 2008 (unofficially bypassing installation, version X is the last officially-supported version) and OS X versions Snow Leopard-Mountain Lion.	Windows/Mac	Some new features include a completely redesigned PDF editing experience, exporting PDF files to Microsoft PowerPoint, touch-friendly capabilities for mobile devices, and integrated cloud services. LiveCycle Designer is no longer bundled (but remains a standalone product). Acrobat XI was released to the market on October 15, 2012.
DC (2015)	April 6, 2015	Support by Adobe for Adobe Acrobat Classic 2015 and Acrobat Reader Classic 2015 ended April 7, 2020. The UI in this version has changed dramatically since version XI. Adobe Acrobat DC is available for Windows 7 or later. It is also available for Mac OS X 10.9 or later. Beginning in this version, version numbers are now labeled by year of release, not by the number of the release. As such, this has version number "15" instead of "12". Also, Adobe Acrobat DC is split into two tracks, continuous and classic. The classic track has updates released quarterly and does not provide new features in updates, whereas the continuous track has updates issued more frequently with updates performed silently and automatically.	Windows/Mac	Reader returns to the "Adobe Acrobat Reader" name.; There is a heavy focus on the Adobe Document Cloud feature. "DC" is now appended to the product name for both tracks (notwithstanding the classic track's default installation folder being Acrobat 2015 with only the continuous track's being Acrobat DC).; The multiple document interface is added back (with release 2015.009 of the continuous track), but with a tabbed interface instead of the original windowed interface.
2017 Standard/Pro DC (2017)	June 6, 2017	Based on Acrobat2017_MUI (06-06-17). Acrobat Standard 2017 is not available on macOS. "DC" branding denotes the "continuous track" (subscription-based release that receives regular feature updates). Year-number branding denotes the "classic track" (perpetual license release that only receives fixes).	Windows/Mac	
2020 Standard/Pro DC (2020)	June 1, 2020	Based on Acrobat2020_MUI (01-06-20). Acrobat Standard 2020 is not available on macOS. "DC" branding denotes the "continuous track" (subscription-based release that receives regular feature updates). Year-number branding denotes the "classic track" (perpetual license release that only receives fixes).	Windows/Mac	
2021 Standard/Pro				As of this release, the 64-bit (x64) version of the software is being rolled out
2022 Standard/Pro	October 11, 2022		Windows/Mac	Both 32-bit (x86) and 64-bit (x64) are available.; It presents a compact UI experience, helps export PDF from Page Thumbnails, and provides readiness with macOS Ventura.
23.003			Windows/Mac	
...				
24.002	May 05, 2024	This release is an optional update which contains enhancements around Gen AI features in Acrobat & Reader		Release Notes
24.003	Oct 03, 2024	They added AI image generation and editing with Adobe Express to all paid Acrobat versions.	Windows/Web/Mobile	Generate images from texts.; Editing images

== Reader Touch ==
=== 1.0 ===
Originally called Adobe Reader For Windows Tablets (Version 1.0) was released on the Microsoft Windows Store on the second week of December 2012, based on the Adobe Reader Mobile engine found in the iOS, Android, Blackberry and Windows phone versions, is the first application written by Adobe Systems for the Metro Style interface. The current versions offers only basic PDF reading features, subsequent patches will bring more complex features to catch up with the more feature complete iOS and Android versions. Adobe Reader for Windows Tablets supports both ARM and Intel x86/x86_64 architectures and can be used both via touch and more classic keyboard+mouse combination. The main features are:

- Windows Native App and UI
- Semantic Zoom to jump between pages
- Bookmarks and search feature
- Opening password protected PDF
- Select and Copy text

On February 1, 2013, Adobe Reader for Windows Tablet has been officially renamed to Adobe Reader Touch to tell Hybrid Desktop Windows Users which version of Adobe Reader may have (Modern UI or Desktop Version). Name change apart, the changes include:

- Easier Document Navigation With Mouse and Keyboard ([+] and [-] Zoom Buttons)
- View Sticky Notes

=== 1.1 ===
Version 1.1 was released on April 11, 2013. The changes include:

- Printing
- Keyboard shortcuts for Find, Open, Print and Close

=== 1.2 ===
Version 1.2 was released on June 27, 2013. This update adds:

- Go To Page for quicker navigation
- Notes to your document
- Highlight, Strikeout and Underline with Selection and Markup Tool to text
- View Notes attached to text markup
- Save and Save As functionality

=== 1.3 ===
- Fill and Save PDF Forms
- Change Color of Highlight, Underline and Strikeout text markups

=== 3.1 ===
- Released in 2014. Also named as Version 2016. It has reached end-of-life, effective October 13, 2021. The version is no longer available in the Windows app store.

== Reader for Android ==
=== 10.0 ===
The first Android edition of Adobe Reader X was released to the Android Market (now Google Play Store) on November 18, 2010. Main features include:

- Text Search
- Password Protected Documents
- Quick Jump Between Pages In Documents
- Sharing A Document
- Fit-To-Screen Viewing Mode
- PDF Portfolios
- Performance & Security Enhancements

=== 10.1 ===
Version 10.1 was released on October 9, 2011 with added support for Android Tablets, The new features include:

- Tablet-friendly UI
- Navigation using Bookmarks
- Text selection copy
- View comments
- Faster document open time and flips
- Smoother Pinch-Zoom experience
- Visibly less "white" as you navigate the document
- Intermediate rendering feedback for complex documents
- Support for viewing PDFs protected with Adobe LiveCycle Rights Management
- Higher Quality image rendering

=== 10.5 ===
Version 10.5 was released on the Google Play Store the 6 March 2013, this update brings multiple new features and improvements to Reader For Android:

- Go to Page
- Night Mode
- Smart Zoom
- Screen Brightness Lock
- Undo In Freehand Annotation
- Sync last position on Acrobat.com
- Forms Central PDF Validation
- Google Cloud Print
- "Back" after clicking an internal link or bookmark

=== 11.1 ===
- Ability to Purchase Adobe PDF Pack and Adobe ExportPDF Services directly from Adobe Reader
- Conversion of Documents and Images in PDF with Adobe PDF Pack
- Export PDF File in Word or Excel format with Adobe ExportPDF
- New and improved search experience
- Online Help
- New and improved UI with MultiWindow support

=== 11.2 ===
- Support for user-added bookmarks
- Read out loud and UI navigation with accessibility mode
- Telephone hyperlinks for automatic dialing from within PDF
- Enhanced UI in document view
- Two page viewing mode for tablets

== Reader for iOS ==
=== 10.1 ===
On October 9, 2011, Adobe Systems Inc. released a port of Adobe Reader X (10.1) for the Apple iOS devices, featuring an optimized UI for both for the iPhone/iPod Touch and the iPad. The iOS port was at feature parity with the Android version 10.1, the main features are:

- Text Search
- Password Protected Documents
- Sharing documents with the "Open With..." command
- Tablet friendly UI
- Navigation using Bookmarks
- Text selection copy
- Print via AirPrint Framework
- View Comments
- Faster document open time and flips
- Smoother Pinch-Zoom experience
- Visibly less "white" as you navigate the document
- Intermediate rendering feedback for complex documents
- Support for viewing PDFs protected with Adobe LiveCycle Rights Management
- Higher Quality image rendering
- Security and stability Improvements

=== 10.5 ===
Version 10.5 was released on the Apple Store the 9 March 2013, this update brings a number of new features and improvements to Reader For iOS:

- Go to Page
- Night Mode
- Smart Zoom
- Screen Brightness Lock
- Undo In Freehand Annotation
- Sync last position on Acrobat.com
- Forms Central PDF Validation
- VoiceOver Support for Accessibility
- Bluetooth Keyboard Support for Form-Field Navigation

=== 10.6 ===
- Enhanced integration with Acrobat.com
- Options to flatten when Sharing files
- View notes attached to text markup
- Updated iPhone UI
- Delete and Rename files in Acrobat.com

=== 11 ===
- Ability to buy Adobe CreatePDF service using In app purchase
- Convert an image to PDF using Adobe's CreatePDF service
- Create PDF files from a variety of file formats using CreatePDF service
- Ability to buy Adobe ExportPDF service using in app purchase
- Export PDF files to various formats (Word, excel, etc..) for editing using ExportPDF service

=== 11.2 ===
- Updated UI to be iOS7 native
- Updated recent documents UI
- Improved file management
- Integrated help
- Improved accuracy of text selection
- Added monthly option for PDF Pack Subscription
- Upgraded navigation
- Fixed crashes

=== 15.0.0 ===
Adobe Reader is now Adobe Acrobat DC. Version 15.0.0 was released on April 7, 2015, supporting iOS 8.0 and above. The new features include:

- Easily accomplish frequent tasks from the new Tools menu
- View recent files across computers and devices with Mobile Link
- Use free Adobe Fill & Sign to fill, sign, and send forms on your iPad
- Edit text on your iPad with font matching, sizing, colors, and more
- Organize pages: reorder, rotate, and delete pages in PDF files
- Undo and redo changes including highlights, comments, and text edits
- Open files stored in your Creative Cloud account
- Sign in with support for Enterprise IDs

=== 15.0.1 ===
Version 15.0.1 was released on April 18, 2015, supporting iOS 8.0 and above. The new features include:

- Easily access free annotation tools! Select “Comment” from the Tool Switcher
- Find files faster. File list now defaults to Local Files
- Bug fixes

=== 15.0.2 ===
Version 15.0.2 was released on April 24, 2015, supporting iOS 8.0 and above. The new features include:

- Tap on My Documents to easily find files
- Access free commenting tools from the Viewer
- Enjoy performance improvements for large files
- Bug fixes

=== 15.2 ===
Version 15.2 was released on November 13, 2015, supporting iOS 8.0 and above. The new features include:

- Integration with Dropbox to open and save files. Connect your Dropbox account to Acrobat Reader to:
  - Browse and open your Dropbox files
  - Annotate, edit and sign PDF files
  - Save changes back to Dropbox

=== 15.3 ===
Version 15.3 was released on January 5, 2016, supporting iOS 8.0 and above. The new features include:

- Sign PDFs using the new e-signature panel:
  - Capture your handwritten signature via camera
  - Save your e-signature to use each time you sign
  - Automatically sync your e-signature to use with Adobe Acrobat Pro, Standard, or Reader on desktop
- Fixed:
  - Bugs that caused lost comments and annotations
  - Crashes and improved stability

=== 15.4 ===
Version 15.4 was released on January 23, 2016, supporting iOS 8.0 and above. The new features include:

- Improved reading experience for PDFs with bookmarks
- Changed bookmark destinations to ignore zoom settings
- Fixed:
  - Intermittent crashes
  - Crashes when opening certain documents
  - Bug in PDF rendering where content was not visible

=== 16.02.23 ===
Version 16.02.23 was released on February 17, 2016, supporting iOS 8.0 and above. The new features include:

- Optimized for iPad Pro: View, annotate and sign documents on iPad Pro's expansive display.
- Added support for iOS 9 Split View and Slide Over: Multitask with two apps open side by side.
- Expanded support for Dropbox: Save files directly to Dropbox with the new “Save to…” menu item.
- Decreased app file size.
- Fixed:
  - Drawing performance with Apple Pencil.
  - Intermittent VoiceOver crashes.
  - Issue when viewing documents containing some Asian fonts.
  - Sporadic crashes when editing documents.

=== 16.03.15 ===
Version 16.03.15 was released on March 10, 2016, supporting iOS 8.0 and above. Features include:

- Expanded support for Dropbox: Use Create PDF and Export PDF on files stored in Dropbox. (Subscription required.)
- Improved performance when tapping on form fields and comments in certain PDFs.

=== 16.04.05 ===
Version 16.04.05 was released on March 30, 2016, supporting iOS 8.0 and above. Features include:

- Ability to remove individual items from Recent files list.
- Improved palm rejection to remove marks from resting your palm on the screen when using Apple Pencil with iPad Pro.
- Fixed:
  - Issue with applying image-based signatures.
  - Ability to share files with names containing certain symbols.
  - Bug causing users to be unexpectedly signed out of Adobe Document Cloud.
  - Improved stability.

=== 16.05.17 ===
Version 16.05.17 was released on May 4, 2016, supporting iOS 8.0 and above. The new features include:

- Fixed:
  - Slow scrolling of file listings on iOS 9.3 and above.
  - Bug preventing some edits to be saved to PDF.
  - Ability to move, rename, and delete the correct file in filtered lists.

=== 16.06.28 ===
Version 16.06.28 was released on June 16, 2016, supporting iOS 9.0 and above. The new features include:

- Reflow text and images using Reading Mode:
  - Display text in an easy-to-read format for smaller devices.
  - Pinch or double-tap to change text size.

=== 16.08.09 ===
Version 16.08.09 was released on August 9, 2016, supporting iOS 9.0 and above. The new features include:

- Connect to storage providers with More Locations: Select, open, and save documents stored in iCloud Drive and other document storage providers like Box, Microsoft OneDrive, and Google Drive.
- Bug fixes.

=== 16.09.20 ===
Version 16.09.20 was released on September 16, 2016, supporting iOS 9.0 and above. The new features include:

- Quickly find PDFs directly from the Home screen using Spotlight Search. Touch your finger to the screen and drag down to get started.
- Compatible with iOS 10.
- Bug fixes.

=== 16.11.01 ===
Version 16.11.01 was released on October 26, 2016, supporting iOS 9.0 and above. The new features include:

- View opened PDF filenames in the top bar.
- Fixed:
  - Issue with printing PDFs with form fields and comments.
  - Ability to open files from search results.
- Bug fixes.

=== 16.11.22 ===
Version 16.11.22 was released on November 17, 2016, supporting iOS 9.0 and above. The new features include:

- Scan anything with your device camera:
  - Snap a photo of a document, whiteboard, form, picture, receipt, or note and save it as a PDF.
  - Scan multiple document pages into a single PDF and reorder as desired.
  - Save and share scanned PDFs.
  - Enhance your camera images with improved boundary detection, perspective correction, and text sharpness.
  - Requires iPhone 5s+, iPad 3+, iPad Mini 2+, and iOS 9+.

=== 16.12.13 ===
Version 16.12.13 was published on December 7, 2016, supporting iOS 9.0 and above. The new features include:

- Enjoy improved performance with text markup tools.
- Easily fill and sign any form on your IPhone by connecting to the free Adobe Fill & Sign app from the Tool Switcher.
- Bug fixes.

=== 20.013.20074 ===
Adobe Acrobat Pro DC Version 21.007.20099 is the most current version for free download as of 21 Dec 2021.

=== 22.003.20314 ===
Adobe Acrobat Pro DC Version 22.003.20314 is the most current version as of Jan 24, 2023.
