= Adobe LiveCycle Designer =

Forms authoring software tool

LiveCycle Designer
- Developer: Adobe Systems
- Stable release: ES4 / 2013
- Operating system: Windows
- Type: Form Designer
- License: 6.0 EULA 7.0 EULA
- Website: www.adobe.com/products/server/adobedesigner/

Adobe LiveCycle Designer was a forms authoring tool published by Adobe Systems, intended as a one-stop design tool to render XML forms as PDF or HTML files.

== Overview ==
Adobe LiveCycle Designer was primarily used for creating and managing electronic forms within enterprise environments. It allowed organizations to design interactive and dynamic forms that could capture, validate, and submit data electronically. The software was widely applied in business, government, and financial sectors to automate form-driven processes such as applications, surveys, and internal documentation workflows. LiveCycle Designer supported both PDF and XDP (XML Data Package) formats, enabling integration with databases and server-based systems for data exchange. Forms could include interactive elements, calculations, and validation scripts written in JavaScript or FormCalc, making them adaptable for various data-entry and reporting tasks.

== History ==
Designer began as a component of PerForm, an Electronic forms software package created by Delrina. Delrina was bought by Symantec in 1995, which subsequently sold its Electronic Forms division to JetForm in 1996. JetForm (later renamed Accelio) was purchased by Adobe in 2002. Adobe ended the support of the Accelio version of the product in 2004.

In late 2003, Designer was redesigned and released as the Adobe Forms Designer.

In March 2004, Adobe shipped Adobe Designer 6.0 for use with Adobe's Intelligent Document Platform and with version 6 of the Adobe Acrobat software. This release included support for creating dynamic forms with data propagated by the Adobe Form Server, support for the XML Data Package (XDP) file format, as well as importing existing forms from Adobe Acrobat, Adobe Output Designer, Microsoft InfoPath and Microsoft Word.

In December 2004, Adobe released Designer as Adobe LiveCycle Designer 7.0 as part of the LiveCycle suite of products. This release added the ability to create dynamic forms that do not require the Adobe Form Server for dynamic features, tools for creating Email submissions, and the Paper Forms barcode tool. Designer 7.0 is bundled with Adobe Acrobat Professional 7.0 (on Microsoft Windows only) and available as a stand-alone product. In December 2005, Adobe released Adobe LiveCycle Designer 7.1 as a stand-alone upgrade. Acrobat 8 shipped in November 2006 bundled with a new version of LiveCycle Designer (version 8).

LiveCycle Designer was included with Adobe Acrobat Pro Version 9. It is included in Adobe Acrobat X Pro as Adobe LiveCycle Designer ES2, but it is sold separately since Adobe Acrobat XI Pro. However, owners of a prior licensed version of Acrobat Professional who qualify for and purchase an upgrade to Adobe Acrobat XI Professional also qualify for a free upgrade to LiveCycle Designer ES4.

The core support for Adobe LiveCycle ES4 ended March 2018. Adobe suggests upgrading to Adobe Experience Manager Forms.

== Features ==
- Designer forms are structured documents with a hierarchical structure that can be converted into XML. This structure can include structure from XML Schema and example XML files.
- Designer forms can be saved as PDF files or XDP files. XDP files are used by the Adobe LiveCycle Form Server to render files to PDF or HTML as needed.
- PDF forms made in Designer can be designed to be dynamic (changing layout in response to data propagated from other sources), interactive (capable of accepting user input) or both. As of Designer 7.0, dynamic features of these PDF forms can be manipulated by the Adobe Form Server during the rendering process, or by the Adobe Acrobat/Acrobat Reader client during viewing.
- Designer allows JavaScript to be embedded into a form, allowing programmatic changes to the form layout as well as communication with various data sources (SOAP, OLEDB).
- Besides JavaScript, Designer includes a proprietary scripting language called FormCalc (in Adobe LiveCycle Designer ES2).

== Limitations ==
- Designer works on a Windows only platform.
- Viewing PDF forms made with Designer requires Acrobat/Adobe Reader 6.0.2 or later, and will not work with many third party PDF tools.
- PDF forms made with Designer cannot be edited in Adobe Acrobat, only viewed.
- Some features of Designer forms are dependent on 'user rights' activated through the Adobe LiveCycle Reader Extensions server product. This applies to all PDFs, even ones created with Acrobat and other 3rd party vendors.
- Acrobat has been able to make forms since Acrobat 3.0, and there are some third-party tools which can work with them in addition to Adobe software. However, these are a type of form now called acroforms. Forms created by Designer are an incompatible type (commonly XFA forms) and are not in general compatible with existing non-Adobe software. Owners of Acrobat 7.0 Professional have the choice of making acroforms directly, or using the bundled (on Windows) copy of Designer to create XFA forms.
- When a form object is bound to an XML node, the value from that node may only be extracted once. If several objects share the same binding, only the first object will receive the node value when the form is processed.
- There are limitations in the ability of Designer to parse HTML and display it in a form; Designer cannot handle a number of fundamental tags, including ordered list, unordered list and tables.
- The program has had a reported consistent issue with users being able to set the tabbing order correctly. The system often reorders the entire form causing the user to have to start over. This problem has never been corrected but can be reduced by the user ensuring every field has a unique name (i.e. Yes/No Radio 1, Yes/No Radio 2, etc.).
