= Static field =

Static field may refer to:

- Electrostatic field, an electric field that does not change with time
- Magnetostatic field, a stationary magnetic field, see Magnetostatics
- Class variable, a variable declared with the static keyword in object-oriented programming languages
