= Cheyne Gallarde =

Queer illustrator, actor and photographer

Cheyne Gallarde (born 1980) is an American queer illustrator, actor and photographer who was born and raised in Hawaii. He is known for his vintage comic style drawings which generally focus on significant figures in the LGBTQ+ community.

== Career ==
Gallarde is a creator who works in various fields in the arts. He has been chosen by several companies to contribute his illustrations, photographs, and insight. In 2015, he was a guest speaker at a TEDx presentation in Honolulu. Gallarde was also chosen by GLAAD and Adobe to be featured in their pride series "Create Change" which focuses on LGBTQ+ community issues, inspiration, and self-expression.

=== Photography ===
Cheyne Gallarde was the founder and photographer of Firebird Photography. His photographic work mostly consists of self-portrait series that highlight differences at the individual level.

- 2013: Loading Zone Exhibition at Universe One. Collection of self portrait photos displaying unique real and fictional characters to display diversity.
- 2014: Channeling Your Inner Everyone art installation at Spalding House Contemporary Art Museum. Collection of self-portraits of individuals from different cultural backgrounds.

=== Illustration ===
Cheyne Gallarde is most commonly known for his comic style illustrations.

Cheyne Gallarde's Illustration Collections
Exhibition/ Contribution Title	Year	Description	Source
Ordinary Ohana	2016	Illustrator of book	Pennybacker, and Star-Advertiser Newspaper
Pow!Wow! Hawaii Festival Mural	NA	Mural of mahu, third-gender people, of Hawaii	The Advocate
Honolulu's Rainbow Film Festival	2019	Key contributor in visuals	Mark and Art Sphere Inc.
Legendary Children	2020	Comic style cover art	The Advocate and Kam
MTV VMA Video of the Year	2020	Comic style illustrations of MTV's video of year nominees	Kam, and Art Sphere Inc.
Heroes of History	NA	Comic style illustrations of significant figures	Art Sphere Inc.
Netflix Superqueeroes	NA	Comic style illustrations of LGBTQ+ figures featured in Netflix	Art Sphere Inc.
Moving Parts	NA	Comic Style illustration of Trixie Mattel	Art Sphere Inc.
Bobo's Pride Bars	2021	Designed packaging for Bobo's limited edition LGBTQ+ Series Pride Bars	PR Newswire

== Awards ==
- 2012: Rainbow Film Festival Key Visuals Award, for contribution to festival
- 2019: National Advertising Award, for drawings of well-known LGBTQ+ figures for Logo TV
- 2020: Pele Award Gold Winner, for contributing illustrations for the MTV Music Awards
