= Member variable =

Variable associated with a specific object, and accessible for all its methods

In object-oriented programming, a member variable (sometimes called a member field) is a variable that is associated with a specific object, and accessible for all its methods (member functions).

In class-based programming languages, these are distinguished into two types: class variables (also called static member variables), where only one copy of the variable is shared with all instances of the class; and instance variables, where each instance of the class has its own independent copy of the variable.

== Examples ==
=== C++ ===
class Foo {
    int bar; // Member variable
  public:
    void setBar(const int newBar) { 
      bar = newBar;
    }
};

int main () {
  Foo rect; // Local variable

  return 0;
}

=== Java ===
public class Program
{
    public static void main(String[] args)
    {
    	// This is a local variable. Its lifespan
    	// is determined by lexical scope.
    	Foo foo;
    }
}

public class Foo
{
    /* This is a member variable - a new instance
     of this variable will be created for each 
     new instance of Foo.  The lifespan of this
     variable is equal to the lifespan of "this"
     instance of Foo
    */

    int bar;
}

=== Python ===
class Foo:
    def __init__(self):
        self._bar = 0

    @property
    def bar(self):
        return self._bar

    @bar.setter
    def bar(self, new_bar):
        self._bar = new_bar

f = Foo()
f.bar = 100
print(f.bar)

=== Common Lisp ===
(defclass foo () (bar))                                                         
                                                                                
(defvar f (make-instance 'foo))                                                 
(setf (slot-value f 'bar) 100)
(print (slot-value f 'bar))

=== Ruby ===
/*
  Ruby has three member variable types: class, class instance, and instance.
*/

class Dog

  # The class variable is defined within the class body with two at-signs
  # and describes data about all Dogs *and* their derived Dog breeds (if any)
  @@sniffs = true

end

mutt = Dog.new
mutt.class.sniffs #=> true

class Poodle < Dog

  # The "class instance variable" is defined within the class body with a single at-sign
  # and describes data about only the Poodle class. It makes no claim about its parent class
  # or any possible subclass derived from Poodle
  @sheds = false

  # When a new Poodle instance is created, by default it is untrained. The 'trained' variable
  # is local to the initialize method and is used to set the instance variable @trained
  # An instance variable is defined within an instance method and is a member of the Poodle instance
  def initialize(trained = false)
    @trained = trained
  end

  def has_manners?
    @trained
  end

end

p = Poodle.new
p.class.sheds #=> false
p.has_manners? #=> false

=== PHP ===
<?php

class Example
{
    /**
     * Example instance member variable.
     *
     * Member variables may be public, protected or private.
     *
     * @var int
     */
    public int $foo;
    
    /**
     * Example static member variable.
     *
     * @var bool
     */
    protected static int $bar;
    
    /**
     * Example constructor method.
     *
     * @param int $foo
     */
    public function __construct(int $foo)
    {
        // Sets foo.
        $this->foo = $foo;
    }
}

// Create a new Example object.
// Set the "foo" member variable to 5.
$example = new Example(5);

// Overwrite the "foo" member variable to 10.
$example->foo = 10;

// Prints 10.
echo $example->foo;

=== Lua ===
--region example
--- @class example_c
--- @field foo number Example "member variable".
local example_c = {}
local example_mt = {__index = example_c}

--- Creates an object from example.
--- @return example_c
function example_c.new(foo)
  -- The first table argument is our object's member variables.
  -- In a Lua object is a metatable and its member variables are table key-value pairs.
  return setmetatable({
    foo = foo
  }, example_mt)
end
--endregion

-- Create an example object.
-- Set the "foo" member variable to 5.
local example = example_c.new(5)

-- Overwrite the "foo" member variable to 10.
example.foo = 10

-- Prints 10.
print(example.foo)

== See also ==
- Global variable
- Local variable
- Property (programming)
