= Adobe Distiller =

Software application

- Stable release: 17.9
- Operating system: Windows, Mac OS, Solaris, Unix
- License: Same as Adobe Acrobat
- Website: helpx.adobe.com/acrobat/using/creating-pdfs-acrobat-distiller.html

Adobe Acrobat Distiller is a software application for converting documents from PostScript format to Adobe PDF (Portable Document Format), the native format of the Adobe Acrobat family of products. It was first shipped as a component of Acrobat in 1993. Acrobat 4, in 1999, added preset configuration files to Distiller, and Acrobat 5, in 2001, added improved color management. Originally a separate application, Distiller eventually became incorporated into a printer driver for creating PDF files that preserved the printed appearance of documents from other applications.

A related Adobe product, Acrobat Distiller Server was released in 2000 and provided the ability to perform high-volume conversion of PostScript to PDF formats through a centralized client-server architecture. In 2013, Distiller Server was discontinued in favor of the PDF Generator component of Adobe LiveCycle.
