= Field name =

Field name may refer to:

- In computer science, a name identifying a field in a database record
- In Great Britain and Ireland, the name of a field; they were all named, as often seen on old parish maps, title maps and early and pre-Ordnance Survey maps
- The geographic designation for a piece of land (toponymy)
- In any field science, the common name, contrasted with the scientific name.
