= Adobe LiveCycle Reader Extensions =

The Adobe LiveCycle Reader Extensions is software that users can use to enable some features, in Acrobat Reader (now Adobe Reader) 5.1 and later on a per-file basis. These are features otherwise found in the full licensed product Adobe Acrobat.

For example, Adobe Reader cannot normally save filled in forms or apply digital signatures. If LiveCycle Reader Extensions is purchased with suitable options, it can prepare files that Reader can save or sign.

LiveCycle Reader Extensions is sold on a quotation basis, and the price will vary according to the number of forms and end users, on the basis that these are nominally lost sales of Acrobat. The original marketing target was large businesses and government organizations such as the US Internal Revenue Service (who make savable forms available through this technology).

Smaller businesses have wished there was a service for enabling single forms at lower cost. Two Adobe partners have contracted to provide this service for companies at a fee per page and use, user or form.

The Reader extensions to enable adding comments in Reader (but no other features) are also available in Acrobat Professional 7.0. This disables form filling, since otherwise saving comments would provide a back door for saving filled in forms.

The EULA for Adobe Reader now forbids enabling features found in Acrobat except via files enabled via licensed Adobe Reader Extensions. This, it has been argued, would prevent third parties reverse engineering the system and offering alternative software since the end users would be in a situation of license violation.

== Acrobat 8 Professional ==
With the release of Acrobat 8 Professional, users can now enable the save feature in a PDF file for distribution to people with Adobe Reader 7.0 and later thus eliminating the need for Reader Extensions for this particular application. According to Adobe, this feature only applies to ad hoc forms distribution and data collection. The license agreement for Acrobat 8 Professional limits this functionality to 500 unique users, or 500 submissions (see paragraph 14.13.3 of the End User License Agreement for Acrobat 8 Professional). Other privileges remain the domain only of LiveCycle Reader Extensions, and it is also needed for bulk or automated operations.
