= Prototype pollution =

Class of web security vulnerabilities

Prototype pollution is a class of vulnerabilities in prototype-based languages such as JavaScript runtimes that allows attackers to overwrite arbitrary properties in an object's root prototype. In a prototype pollution attack, attackers inject properties into existing JavaScript construct prototypes with unsafe merges. Prototype pollution can affect client-side and server-side runtimes. Using prototype pollution to modify properties called by gadgets could lead to Denial of Service (DoS) attacks, code execution, or privilege escalation.
