= Property (programming) =

Class member in object-oriented programming

A property, in some object-oriented programming languages, is a special sort of class member, intermediate in functionality between a field (or data member) and a method. The syntax for reading and writing of properties is like for fields, but property reads and writes are (usually) translated to 'getter' and 'setter' method calls. The field-like syntax is easier to read and write than many method calls, yet the interposition of method calls "under the hood" allows for data validation, active updating (e.g., of graphical user interface (GUI) elements), or implementing what may be called "read-only fields".

== Support in languages ==
Programming languages that support properties include C#, D, ECMAScript (ActionScript 3, JavaScript), eC, F#, Kotlin, Object Pascal (Delphi, Free Pascal), Objective-C 2.0, Python, Scala, Swift, Lua, and Visual Basic.

Some object-oriented languages, such as Java and C++, do not support properties, requiring the programmer to define a pair of accessor and mutator methods instead.

Oberon-2 provides an alternative mechanism using object variable visibility flags.

Other languages designed for the Java virtual machine, such as Groovy, support properties natively.

While C++ does not have first class properties, they can be emulated with operator overloading.

Some C++ compilers support first class properties as language extensions.

- In Microsoft Visual Studio, GNU Compiler Collection (GCC), and llvm/clang, the __declspec(property) creates properties similar to C#.
- Borland C++ and Borland–CodeGear–Embarcadero C++Builder use the __property keyword.

In many object-oriented languages properties are implemented as a pair of accessor–mutator methods, but accessed using the same syntax as for public fields. Omitting a method from the pair yields a read-only or an uncommon write-only property.

In some languages with no built-in support for properties, a similar construct can be implemented as a single method that either returns or changes the underlying data, depending on the context of its invocation. Such techniques are used e.g., in Perl.

Some languages (Ruby, Smalltalk) achieve property-like syntax using normal methods, sometimes with a limited amount of syntactic sugar.

== Syntax variants ==
Some languages follow well-established syntax conventions for formally specifying and utilizing properties and methods.

Among these conventions:

- Dot notation
- Bracket notation

=== Dot notation ===
The following example demonstrates dot notation in JavaScript.

document.createElement("pre");

=== Bracket notation ===
The following example demonstrates bracket notation in JavaScript.

document["createElement"]("pre");

== Example syntax ==
=== C# ===
class Pen 
{
    private int color; // private field
    
    // public property
    public int Color 
    {  
        get
        {
            return this.color;
        }
        set 
        {
            if (value > 0) 
            {
                this.color = value;
            }
        }
    }
}

// accessing:
Pen pen = new();
int colorTmp = 0;
// ...
pen.Color = 17;
colorTmp = pen.Color;
// ...
pen.Color = ~pen.Color; // bitwise complement ...

// another silly example:
pen.Color += 1; // a lot clearer than "pen.set_Color(pen.get_Color() + 1)"!

Recent C# versions also allow "auto-implemented properties" where the backing field for the property is generated by the compiler during compilation. This means that the property must have a setter. However, it can be private.

class Shape 
{
    public int Height { get; set; }
    public int Width { get; private set; }
}

=== C++ ===
C++ does not have first class properties, but there exist several ways to emulate properties to a limited degree.

==== Standard C++ ====
With unnamed classes, a property could look like:

struct Foo {
    class {
    private:
        int value;
    public:
        int& operator=(const int& i) { 
            return value = i; 
        }
        int operator int() const { 
            return value; 
        }
    } alpha;

    class {
    private:
        float value;
    public:
        float& operator=(const float& f) { 
            return value = f; 
        }
        float operator float() const { 
            return value; 
        }
    } bravo;
};

Additionally, a dedicated, reusable Property<T> type with support for custom assignment and retrieval could look like this:

import std;

using std::conditional_t;
using std::convertible_to;
using std::function;
using std::monostate;

// WithMutator and WithAccessor determine whether mutators and accessors are generated
template <
    typename T,
    bool WithMutator = true,
    bool WithAccessor = true,
    typename MutatorFunc = conditional_t<
        WithMutator,
        function<void(T&, const T&)>,
        monostate
    >,
    typename AccessorFunc = conditional_t<
        WithAccessor,
        function<const T&(const T&)>,
        monostate
    >
>
class Property {
private:
    T value;

    [[no_unique_address]] MutatorFunc mutator;
    [[no_unique_address]] AccessorFunc accessor;
public:
    Property(const T& x = {}) requires (!WithMutator && !WithAccessor):
        value{x} {}

    Property(const T& x = {}, MutatorFunc m = {}, AccessorFunc a = {}) requires (WithMutator || WithAccessor):
        value{x}, mutator{m}, accessor{a} {}

    // Assignment operator with implicit conversion
    // Generated only when WithMutator = true
    Property& operator=(convertible_to<T> auto const& x) requires (WithMutator) {
        if (mutator) {
            mutator(value, x);
        } else {
            value = x;
        }
        return *this;
    }

    // Implicit conversion back to T.
    // Generated only when WithAccessor = true
    [[nodiscard]]
    operator T const&() const requires (WithAccessor) {
        if (accessor) {
            return accessor(value);
        }
        return value;
    }
};

namespace std {
    template <typename T, bool WithMutator, bool WithAccessor, typename MutatorFunc, typename AccessorFunc>
    struct formatter<Property<T, WithMutator, WithAccessor, MutatorFunc, AccessorFunc>> : public formatter<T> {
        auto format(const Property<T, WithMutator, WithAccessor, MutatorFunc, AccessorFunc>& prop, format_context& ctx) const {
            const T& value = static_cast<const T&>(prop);
            return formatter<T>::format(value, ctx);
        }
    };
}

struct Foo {
    // all Property<T> fields must be public
    Property<bool> alpha;
    Property<unsigned int> bravo;
};

int main(int argc, char* argv[]) {
    Foo foo;
    foo.alpha = true;
    foo.bravo = 1;
    std::println("{}, {}, {}, {}", foo.alpha, foo.bravo);
    return 0;
}

==== C++, Microsoft, GCC, LLVM/clang and C++Builder-specific ====
An example adapted from the MSDN documentation page.

// declspec_property.cpp
struct Integer {
    int value;

    void setValue(int j) noexcept { 
        value = j;
    }

    [[nodiscard]]
    int getValue() const noexcept {
        return i;
    }

    __declspec(property(get = getValue, put = setValue)) 
    int prop;
};

int main() {
    Integer s;
    s.prop = 5;
    return 0;
}

=== D ===
class Pen {
    private int myColor; // private field
    
    // public get property
    public int color() {
        return myColor;
    }
    
    // public set property
    public void color(int value) {
         myColor = value;
    }
}

Pen pen = new Pen;
pen.color = ~pen.color; // bitwise complement

// the set property can also be used in expressions, just like regular assignment
int theColor = (pen.color = 0xFF0000);

In D version 2, each property accessor or mutator must be marked with @property:

class Pen {
    private int myColor; // private field
    
    // public get property
    @property 
    public int color() {
        return myColor;
    }
    
    // public set property
    @property 
    public void color(int value) {
        myColor = value;
    }
}

=== eC ===
class Pen 
{
   // private data member
   Color color;
public:
   // public property
   property Color color 
   {  
      get { return color; }
      set { color = value; }
   }
}
Pen blackPen { color = black };
Pen whitePen { color = white };
Pen pen3 { color = { 30, 80, 120 } };
Pen pen4 { color = ColorHSV { 90, 20, 40 } };

=== F# ===
type Pen() = class
    let mutable _color = 0

    member this.Color
        with get() = _color
        and set value = _color <- value
end

let pen = new Pen()
pen.Color <- ~~~pen.Color

=== JavaScript ===
function Pen() {
    this._color = 0;
}

// Add the property to the Pen type itself, can also
// be set on the instance individually
Object.defineProperties(Pen.prototype, {
    color: {
        get: function () {
            return this._color;
        },
        set: function (value) {
            this._color = value;
        }
    }
});

let pen = new Pen();
pen.color = ~pen.color; // bitwise complement
pen.color += 1; // Add one

=== ActionScript 3.0 ===
package {
	public class Pen {
		private var _color: uint = 0;

		public function get color(): uint {
			return _color;
		}

		public function set color(value: uint): void {
			_color = value;
		}
	}
}

var pen: Pen = new Pen();
pen.color = ~pen.color; // bitwise complement
pen.color += 1; // add one

=== Object Pascal (Delphi, Free Pascal) ===
type TPen = class
  private
    FColor: TColor;
    function GetColor: TColor;
    procedure SetColor(const AValue: TColor);
  public
    property Color: Integer read GetColor write SetColor;
end;

function TPen.GetColor: TColor;
begin
  Result := FColor;
end;

procedure TPen.SetColor(const AValue: TColor);
begin
  if FColor <> AValue
   then FColor := AValue;
end;

// accessing:
var Pen: TPen;
// ...
Pen.Color := not Pen.Color;

(*
Delphi and Free Pascal also support a 'direct field' syntax -

property Color: TColor read FColor write SetColor;

or

property Color: TColor read GetColor write FColor;

where the compiler generates the exact same code as for reading and writing
a field. This offers the efficiency of a field, with the safety of a property.
(A pointer cannot get to the property, and a member access can always be
replaced with a method call.)
*)

=== Objective-C 2.0 ===
@interface Pen : NSObject
@property (copy) NSColor *colour;	// The "copy" attribute causes the object's copy to be
					// retained, instead of the original.
@end

@implementation Pen
@synthesize colour;			// Compiler directive to synthesise accessor methods.
					// It can be left behind in Xcode 4.5 and later.
@end

The above example could be used in an arbitrary method like this:

Pen *pen = [[Pen alloc] init];
pen.colour = [NSColor blackColor];
float red = pen.colour.redComponent;
[pen.colour drawSwatchInRect: NSMakeRect(0, 0, 100, 100)];

=== PHP ===
class Pen
{
    private int $color = 1;

    function __set($property, $value)
    {
        if (property_exists($this, $property)) { 
            $this->$property = $value;
        }
    }

    function __get($property)
    {
        if (property_exists($this, $property)) {
            return $this->$property;
        }
        return null;
    }
}

$p = new Pen();
$p->color = ~$p->color; // Bitwise complement
echo $p->color;

=== Python ===
Properties only work correctly for new-style classes (classes that have object as a superclass), and are only available in Python 2.2 and newer (see the relevant section of the tutorial Unifying types and classes in Python 2.2). Python 2.6 added a new syntax involving decorators for defining properties.

class Pen:
    _color: int # "private" variable

    def __init__(self) -> None:
        self._color = 0

    @property
    def color(self) -> int:
        return self._color

    @color.setter
    def color(self, color: int) -> None:
        self._color = color

pen: Pen = Pen()
# Accessing:
pen.color = ~pen.color  # Bitwise complement ...

=== Ruby ===
class Pen
  def initialize
    @color = 0
  end
    
  # Defines a getter for the @color field
  def color
    @color
  end

  # Defines a setter for the @color field
  def color=(value)
    @color = value
  end
end

pen = Pen.new
pen.color = ~pen.color    # Bitwise complement

Ruby also provides automatic getter/setter synthesizers defined as instance methods of Class.

class Pen
  attr_reader :brand    # Generates a getter for @brand (Read-Only)
  attr_writer :size     # Generates a setter for @size  (Write-Only)
  attr_accessor :color  # Generates both a getter and setter for @color (Read/Write)

  def initialize
    @color = 0          # Within the object, we can access the instance variable directly
    @brand = "Penbrand"
    @size = 0.7         # But we could also use the setter method defined by the attr_accessor Class instance method
  end
end

pen = Pen.new
puts pen.brand           # Accesses the pen brand through the generated getter
pen.size = 0.5           # Updates the size field of the pen through the generated setter
pen.color = ~pen.color

=== Visual Basic ===
==== Visual Basic (.NET 2003–2010) ====
Public Class Pen
 
    Private _color As Integer ' Private field

    Public Property Color() As Integer ' Public property
        Get
            Return _color
        End Get
        Set(ByVal value As Integer)
            _color = value
        End Set
    End Property

End Class

' Create Pen class instance
Dim pen As New Pen()

' Set value
pen.Color = 1

' Get value
Dim color As Int32 = pen.Color

==== Visual Basic (only .NET 2010) ====
Public Class Pen

    Public Property Color() As Integer ' Public property

End Class

' Create Pen class instance
Dim pen As New Pen()

' Set value
pen.Color = 1

' Get value
Dim color As Int32 = pen.Color

==== Visual Basic 6 ====
' in a class named clsPen
Private m_Color As Long

Public Property Get Color() As Long
    Color = m_Color
End Property

Public Property Let Color(ByVal RHS As Long)
    m_Color = RHS
End Property

' accessing:
Dim pen As New clsPen
' ...
pen.Color = Not pen.Color

== See also ==
- Variable (computer science)
- Attribute (object-oriented programming)
- Bound property
- Field (computer science)
- Indexer (programming)
- Method (computer programming)
- Mutator method
- Uniform access principle
