= Adobe Document Cloud =

Service from Adobe

- Website type: File hosting
- Owner: Adobe Inc.
- Website: www.adobe.com/documentcloud.html
- Commercial: Yes
- Registration: Required
- Current status: Active

Adobe Document Cloud is a digital service from the software company Adobe used to store PDF files in the cloud and to access them remotely. The service supports integration with Adobe tools to fill and sign forms electronically. Adobe Scan can take pictures of documents, convert them to PDFs, and upload them to and store them in the cloud. The files can be accessed from the Web portal for Adobe Document Cloud as well as from other Adobe applications such as Adobe Acrobat Reader.
