= Instance variable =

Member variable of a class that all its objects possess a their own copy of

In class-based, object-oriented programming, an instance variable is a variable defined in a class (i.e., a member variable), for which each instantiated object of the class has a separate copy, or instance. An instance variable has similarities with a class variable, but is non-static. In C++ or Java language, an instance variable is a variable which is declared in a class but outside of constructors, methods, or blocks. Instance variables are created when an object is instantiated, and are accessible to all the constructors, methods, or blocks in the class. Access modifiers can be given to the instance variable.

An instance variable is not a class variable, although there are similarities. Both are a type of class attribute (or class property, field, or data member). While an instance variable's value may differ between instances of a class, a class variable can only have one value at any one time, shared between all instances. The same dichotomy between instance and class members applies to methods ("member functions") as well.

Each instance variable lives in memory for the lifetime of the object it is owned by.

Instance variables are properties of that object. All instances of a class have their own copies of instance variables, even if the value is the same from one object to another. One class instance can change values of its instance variables without affecting all other instances. A class may have both instance variables and class variables.

Instance variables can be used by all instance methods of an object, but may not be used by class methods. An instance variable may also be changed directly, provided access restrictions are set.

== Examples ==
=== C++ ===
class Request {
private:
    static inline int count1 = 0;
    int number;
public:
    // constructor modifies the instance variable "this->number"
    Request():
        number{count1} {
        ++count1; // modifies the class variable "Request::count1"
    }

};

In this C++ example, the instance variable Request::number is a copy of the class variable Request::count1 where each instance constructed is assigned a sequential value of count1 before it is incremented. Since number is an instance variable, each Request object contains its own distinct value; in contrast, there is only one object Request::count1 available to all class instances with the same value.

=== Java ===
class MyInteger {
    private int x = 0;

    public MyInteger() {}

    public MyInteger(int x) {
        this.x = x;
    }
    
    public void set(int x) {
        this.x = x;
    }

    public int get() {
        return this.x;
    }
}

public class Main {
    public static void main(String[] args) {
        MyInteger myInt1 = new MyInteger();
        MyInteger myInt2 = new MyInteger();
        
        // As set() is an instance method, it can also access the variable
        myInt2.set(-10);
        
        assert myInt1.get() == 10;
        assert myInt2.get() == -10;
    }
}

In this Java example, we can see how instance variables can be modified in one instance without affecting another.

=== Python ===
class Dog:
    def __init__(self, breed: str) -> None:
        self.breed = breed # instance variable

# dog_1 is an object
# which is also an instance of the Dog class
dog_1: Dog = Dog("Border Collie")

In the above Python code, the instance variable is created when an argument is parsed into the class object, with the specification of the breed positional argument.
