= Active updating =

In computer programming, suppose we have a data item A whose value depends on data item B, i.e., the value of A must be changed after the value of B changes and before the value of A becomes necessary. Active updating is updating A immediately after B changes, while passive updating or lazy updating (lazy evaluation) is updating A immediately before its value is fetched. An example of this distinction is, in the implementation of GUI applications: the list of submenu items may depend on the state of the application; this list may be updated either as soon as the state of the application changes ("active") or only when the menu is invoked ("passive").

Another example is updating a visual display as soon as the underlying data changes, as opposed to clicking the "redraw" button. In this situation active updating may create a problem to deal with: an abrupt change of some part of the display may coincide in time with the saccadic movement of the eye, and the change may go unnoticed by a human observer.

See also direct updating vs. deferred updating in transaction processing.
