= Adobe LiveCycle =

Java EE server software

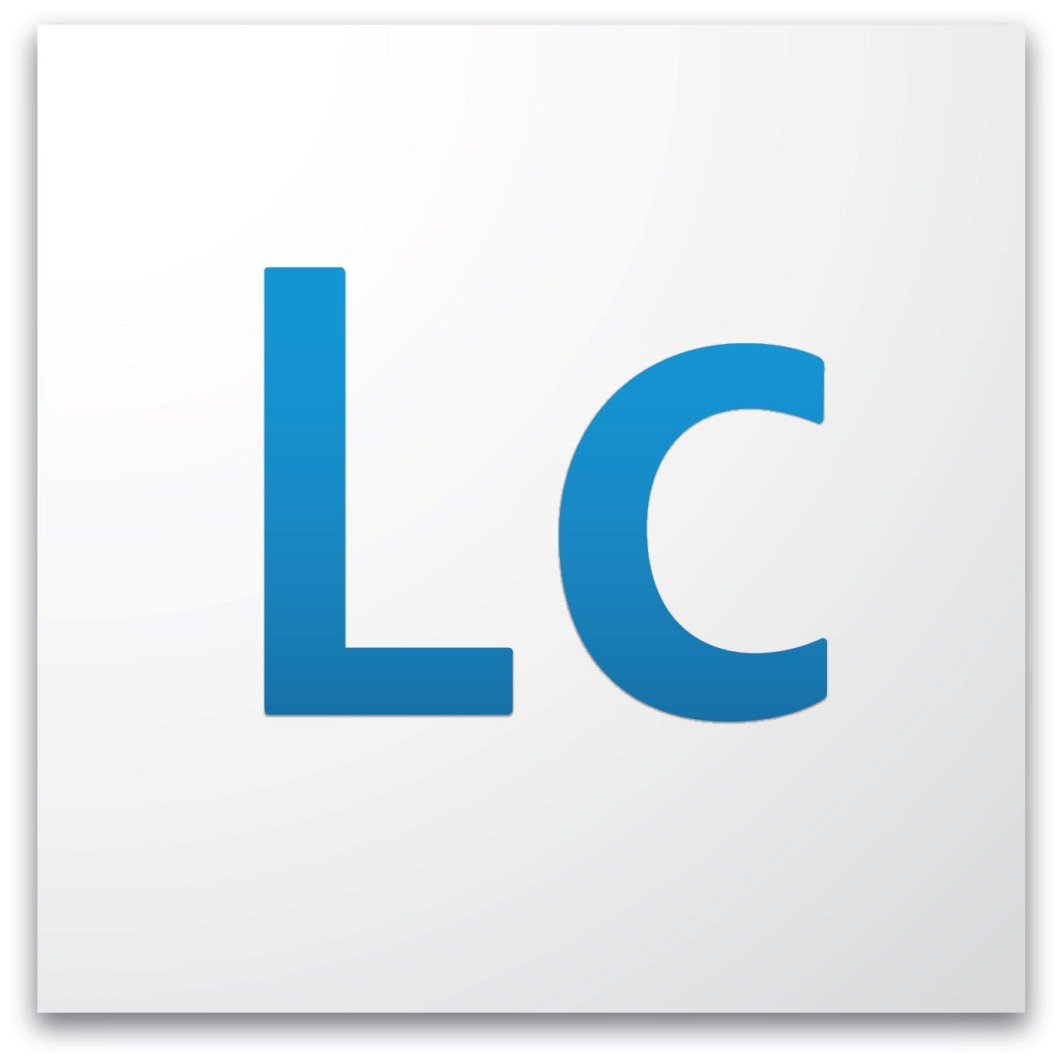
- Developer(s): Adobe Systems
- Stable release: Enterprise Suite (ES4) 11.0.0.0 / March 22, 2013; 11 years ago
- Operating system: Windows, Solaris, AIX, Linux, Android, Windows Mobile, iOS, BlackBerry OS
- Type: Collaborative software
- License: Trialware
- Website: www.adobe.com/products/livecycle

Adobe LiveCycle Enterprise Suite (ES4) is a service-oriented architecture Java EE server software product from Adobe Systems. It is used to build applications that automate various business processes for enterprises and government agencies. LiveCycle ES4 is a document platform designed to help capture and process information, deliver personalized communications, protect and track sensitive information.

It is used for purposes such as account opening, services, benefits enrollment, correspondence management, requests for proposal processes, and other manual-based workflows. LiveCycle ES4 includes features that support mobile devices and can function in both online and offline environments. These capabilities are made possible through Adobe Reader, HTML/PhoneGap, and Flash Player clients, enabling access from desktop computers and mobile devices.

The LiveCycle platform consists of several integrated components and developer tools.

== LiveCycle ES4 components ==
LiveCycle ES4 components are various types of services available to developers including those needed to capture information, manage and optimize processes, secure information, invoke web services, create documents, and integrate with other applications and data sources. The components include shared "foundation" services which include administration, configuration services, service orchestration, invocation methods across components, and encryption services.

The data capture products allow users to create and deploy XML-based form templates as PDFs (Forms Standard and Forms Pro), manage live data (Data Services), and customizes editing functionalities on a per-document basis (Reader Extensions).

It also has multiple features to ensure document security.

== Implications for document management systems ==
PDF documents restricted with LiveCycle DRM are sometimes difficult to use in non-Adobe document management systems because LiveCycle can prevent third-party software from disassembling the PDF, extracting pages, and displaying the contents. In such cases, if LiveCycle does not prevent printing, users may resort to printing PDF documents from compatible Adobe software and scanning the printouts into unrestricted, rasterized PDFs usable in third-party software.
