= Adobe Acrobat =

PDF application software

- Logo used since 2020

- Adobe Acrobat Pro running on Windows 10, displaying a Google Books notice
- Developer: Adobe
- Release: June 15, 1993; 33 years ago

Stable release(s) [±]
- Windows OS, continuous track: 26.002.22031 / October 14, 2026; 35 days ago
- macOS, continuous track: 26.002.22031 / October 14, 2026; 35 days ago
- Windows OS, classic track (2024): 24.001.30429 / September 8, 2026; 2 months ago
- macOS, classic track (2024): 24.001.30429 / September 8, 2026; 2 months ago
- Windows OS, classic track (2020): 20.005.30838 / December 9, 2025; 11 months ago
- macOS, classic track (2020): 20.005.30838 / December 9, 2025; 11 months ago
- Android: 26.9.2.50367 / October 16, 2026; 33 days ago
- iOS: 26.09.50 / October 17, 2026; 32 days ago
- Windows, UWP, PC: 24.005.20320 / February 13, 2024; 2 years ago
- Windows, UWP, mobile: 16.0.137027 / February 3, 2016; 10 years ago
- Linux: 9.5.5 / May 14, 2013; 13 years ago
- Solaris: 9.4.1 / November 30, 2010; 15 years ago
- HP-UX, AIX: 7.0.9 / January 9, 2007; 19 years ago

Preview release(s) [±]
- Android (Beta): 23.11.0.30448.Beta / November 17, 2023; 3 years ago
- Operating system: Windows; macOS; Android; iOS
- Size: 426 MB (Acrobat Reader); 1.11 GB (Acrobat Pro)
- Type: Desktop publishing
- License: Proprietary (freeware or trialware)
- Website: acrobat.adobe.com

Adobe Acrobat is a family of application software and web services developed by Adobe Inc. to view, create, manipulate, print and manage Portable Document Format (PDF) files.

The family comprises Acrobat Reader (formerly Reader), Acrobat Pro, and Acrobat.com. The basic Acrobat Reader, available for several desktop and mobile platforms, is freeware; it supports viewing, printing, scaling or resizing and annotating of PDF files. Additional, "Premium", services are available on paid subscription. The commercial proprietary Acrobat, available for Microsoft Windows, macOS, and mobile, can also create, edit, convert, digitally sign, encrypt, export and publish PDF files. Acrobat.com complements the family with a variety of enterprise content management and file hosting services.

== Purpose ==
The main function of Adobe Acrobat is creating, viewing, and editing PDF documents. It can import popular document and image formats and save them as PDF. It is also possible to import a scanner's output, a website, or the contents of the Windows clipboard.

Because of the nature of the PDF, however, once a PDF document is created, its natural organization and flow cannot be meaningfully modified. In other words, Adobe Acrobat is able to modify the contents of paragraphs and images, but doing so does not repaginate the whole document to accommodate for a longer or shorter document. Acrobat can crop PDF pages, change their order, manipulate hyperlinks, digitally sign a PDF file, add comments, redact certain parts of the PDF file, and ensure its adherence to such standards as PDF/A.

== History ==
Adobe Acrobat was launched in 1993 and had to compete with other products and proprietary formats that aimed to create digital documents:

- Common Ground from No Hands Software Inc.
- Envoy from WordPerfect Corporation
- Folio Views from NextPage
- Replica from Farallon Computing
- WorldView from Interleaf
- DjVu from AT&T Laboratories

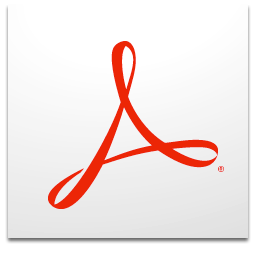
Acrobat XI

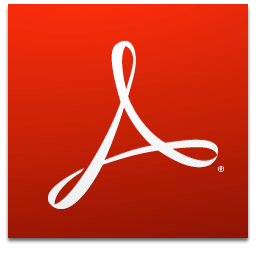
Reader XI

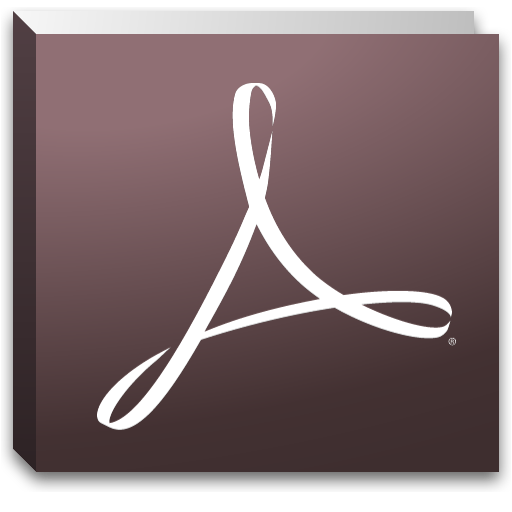
Distiller XI

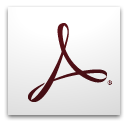
Acrobat.com

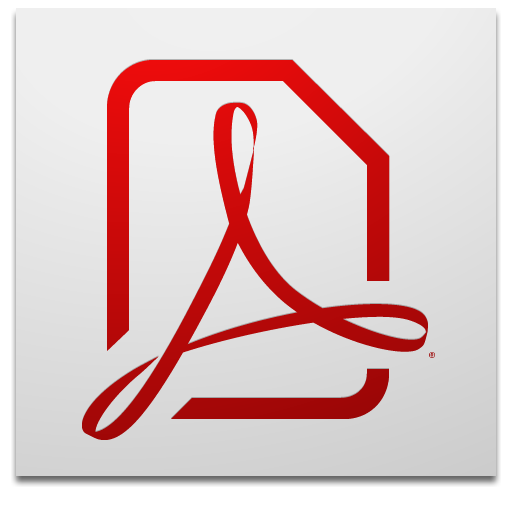
CreatePDF

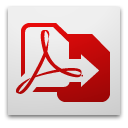
ExportPDF

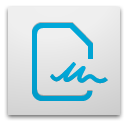
EchoSign

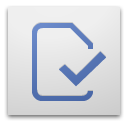
FormsCentral

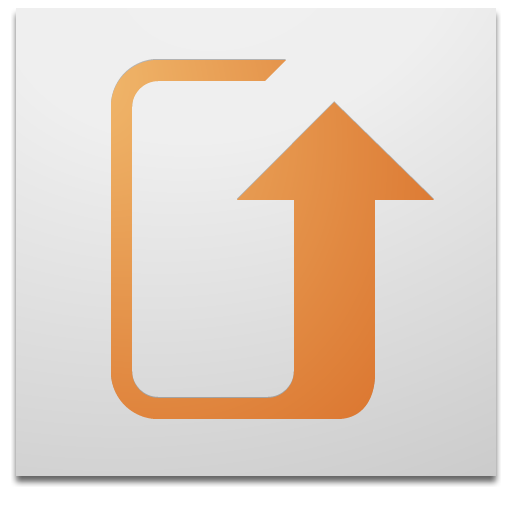
SendNow

Old logos of Acrobat programs and services

Adobe has renamed the Acrobat products several times, in addition to merging, splitting and discontinuing them. Initially, the offered products were called Acrobat Reader, Acrobat Exchange and Acrobat Distiller. "Acrobat Exchange" soon became "Acrobat". Over time, "Acrobat Reader" became "Reader". Between versions 3 and 5, Acrobat did not have several editions. In 1999, the Acrobat.com service came to being and introduced several web services whose names started with "Acrobat", but eventually, "Acrobat.com" was downgraded from the name of the family of services, to that of one of those services.

Unlike most other Adobe products, such as members of Adobe Creative Suite family, the Acrobat products do not have icons that display two letters on a colored rectangle.

=== Document Cloud ===
In April 2015, Adobe introduced the "Document Cloud" branding to signify its adoption of the cloud storage and the software as a service model for enterprise companies. This release included a new version of Acrobat called "Acrobat DC." Following the introduction of Document Cloud, Acrobat.com, which served a similar function, was discontinued.

The GUI had major changes with the introduction of Acrobat DC in 2015, which supports Windows 7 and later, and OS X 10.9 and later. Version numbers are now identified by the last two digits of the year of major release, and the month and year is specified; the previous version was 12, but examples of the DC (Document Cloud) Acrobat product family versions are DC June 2016, version 15.016.20045, released 2 June 2016 and DC Classic January 2016, version 15.006.30119, released 12 January 2016. From DC 2015 the Acrobat family is available in two tracks, the original track, now named Classic, and the Continuous track. Updates for the Classic track are released quarterly, and do not include new features, whereas updates for the Continuous track are issued more frequently, and implemented silently and automatically.

The last pre-DC version, Acrobat XI, was updated to 11.0.23 version (and this was the final release) on November 14, 2017, support for which had ended a month earlier on October 15, 2017. In September 2020, Adobe released a feature to make documents easier to read on phones called "Liquid Mode" using its Sensei AI.

== Apps and services ==
=== Apps ===
The main Adobe Acrobat app has four editions: Reader, Standard, Pro, and Studio.

- Acrobat Reader is the freeware edition of Acrobat for viewing, printing, signing, sharing, and annotating PDFs, although Adobe extensively promotes premium services through it. It is available for Windows, macOS, iOS, and Android, although the mobile versions have fewer features and require Internet access to reach an Adobe online service.
- Acrobat Standard is the basic commercial edition of Acrobat that enables creating, editing, manipulating, and managing PDFs in addition to what Acrobat Reader does. It is available for Windows.
- Acrobat Pro is the mid-tier commercial edition of Acrobat that enables bulk signing and redaction, in addition to what Acrobat Standard does.
- Acrobat Studio is the most expensive commercial edition of Acrobat that allows users to make changes using generative AI.

Additionally:

- Adobe Acrobat Distiller (formerly Adobe Distiller) is a utility bundled with the Windows versions of Adobe Acrobat mentioned above. It converts PostScript documents to PDF.
- Adobe Scan is a mobile app for iOS and Android. It uses a smartphone's camera to scan documents into PDF format.
- Adobe Sign, which appears under Adobe Acrobat Sign on mobile app stores, is a mobile app for digitally signing PDF files.

=== Services ===
Acrobat Web (formerly Acrobat.com) is the web version of Adobe Acrobat. It can create, edit, manipulate, fill, sign, and print PDF file. It requires a web browser and an Adobe ID. It uses Adobe Document Cloud to store and share PDF files on the web.

Additionally, Adobe has a made bevy online web mini-services that offer individual features of Acrobat available on a one-off basis.

=== Artificial intelligence features ===
- Acrobat AI Assistant uses generative AI to answer questions about documents and generate summaries with citations to the source material.
- PDF Spaces allows users to organize and share collections of documents and use Acrobat AI Assistant to summarize and analyze information across multiple files.
- Podcast and presentation generation features allow users to produce audio summaries of documents and generate presentations and reports based on their content.
- Prompt-based PDF editing allows users to modify documents using natural-language commands, including adding or removing pages, finding and replacing text, and changing document security settings.
- Acrobat integrations with ChatGPT, Claude, and Microsoft Copilot allow users to perform PDF-related tasks, including editing documents, merging files, and extracting content, through natural-language prompts.
- Student Spaces allows students to create AI-generated study materials from PDFs, notes, and websites, including summaries, flashcards, and quizzes. The tool is available for free without an Adobe account.

=== Discontinued ===
- Acrobat Approval allows users to deploy electronic forms based on a PDF.
- Acrobat Business Tools is a discontinued component of the Acrobat family that was distributed by Adobe Systems with collaboration and document review features.
- Acrobat Capture is a document processing utility for Windows from Adobe Systems that converts a scan of any paper document into a PDF file with selectable text through OCR technology.
- Acrobat Distiller Server is a discontinued server-based utility that was developed by Adobe Systems to perform centralized high-volume conversion of PostScript documents to PDF formats for workgroups.
- Acrobat eBook Reader is a PDF-based e-book reader from Adobe Systems. Features present in Acrobat eBook Reader later appeared in Digital Editions.
- Acrobat Elements was a very basic version of the Acrobat family that was released by Adobe Systems. Its key feature advantage over the free Acrobat Reader was the ability to create reliable PDF files from Microsoft Office applications.
- Acrobat InProduction is a pre-press tools suite for Acrobat released by Adobe in 2000 to handle color separation and pre-flighting of PDF files for printing.
- Acrobat Messenger is a document utility for Acrobat users that was released by Adobe Systems in 2000 to convert paper documents into PDF files that can be e-mailed, faxed, or shared online.
- Acrobat Reader Touch is a free PDF document viewer developed and released on December 11, 2012, by Adobe Systems for the Windows Touch user interface.
- FormsCentral was a web form filling server for users with Windows, macOS, or a web browser and an Adobe ID only. It was discontinued on July 28, 2015, and replaced with Experience Manager Forms.
- Send & Track (formerly SendNow and Send) was a service that lets you send files as links, track files you send to specific individuals, and get confirmation receipts when others view your file. It was completely discontinued as of July 11, 2018.

=== Hidden helper tools ===
- Acrobat Synchronizer is a tool installed along with Acrobat versions. While running in the background, it maintains the accuracy of Acrobat files imported to Acrobat.
- RdrCEF (also known as Adobe Reader Cloud Extension Feature) is a tool bundled with Acrobat that runs a process that handles cloud connectivity features.

=== Supported file formats ===
The table below contains some of the supported file formats that can be opened or accessed in Adobe Acrobat.

File format	Extension
Acrobat Data File	ACRODATA
Acrobat Forms Data Format	FDF
Adobe Illustrator File	AI
Acrobat Index File	PDX
Acrobat Job Definition File	JDF
Acrobat Language Plug-in	LNG
Acrobat MIME Encoded Job Definition File	MJD
Acrobat Plug-in	ACROPLUGIN
Acrobat Plug-in	API
Acrobat Security Settings File	ACROBATSECURITYSETTINGS
Acrobat Sequence File	SEQU
Acrobat XFDF File	XFDF
Adobe Color Separations Table	AST
Adobe Dictionary Data File	ENV
Adobe Joboptions File	JOBOPTIONS
Adobe Linguistic Library Data File	LEX
Adobe MARS File	MARS
Adobe Portable Document Format File	PDF
Adobe Profile File	APF
Apple QuickTime Movie	MOV
Design Web Format File	DWF
Drawing Exchange Format File	DXF
Encapsulated PostScript Format File	EPSF
Flash MP4 Video File	F4V
Flash Video File	FLV
Hypertext Markup Language	HTM, HTML
iTunes Video File	M4V
Plain Text File	TXT
PostScript File	PS
PostScript Image Data File	PSID
Product Representation Compact File	PRC
Shockwave Flash Movie	SWF
Universal 3D File	U3D
XML Data Package	XDP
XML Paper Specification File	XPS

== Internationalization and localization ==
Adobe Acrobat is available in the following languages: Arabic, Chinese Simplified, Chinese Traditional, Czech, Danish, Dutch, English, Finnish, French, German, Greek, Hebrew, Hungarian, Italian, Japanese, Korean, Norwegian, Polish, Portuguese, Romanian, Russian, Spanish, Swedish, Turkish and Ukrainian. Arabic and Hebrew versions are available from WinSoft International, Adobe Systems' internationalization and localization partner.

Before Adobe Acrobat DC, separate Arabic and Hebrew versions were developed specifically for these languages, which are normally written right-to-left. These versions include special TouchUp properties to manage digits, ligatures option and paragraph direction in right-to-left Middle Eastern scripts such as Arabic, Hebrew, and Persian, as well as standard left-to-right Indian scripts such as Devanagari and Gujarati. The Web Capture feature can convert single web pages or entire web sites into PDF files, while preserving the content's original text encoding. Acrobat can also copy Arabic and Hebrew text to the system clipboard in its original encoding; if the target application is also compatible with the text encoding, then the text will appear in the correct script.

== Security ==
A comprehensive list of security bulletins for most Adobe products and related versions is published on their Security bulletins and advisories page and in other related venues. In particular, the detailed history of security updates for all versions of Adobe Acrobat has been made public.

From Version 3.02 onwards, Acrobat Reader has included support for JavaScript. This functionality allows a PDF document creator to include code which executes when the document is read. Malicious PDF files that attempt to attack security vulnerabilities can be attached to links on web pages or distributed as email attachments. While JavaScript is designed without direct access to the file system to make it "safe", vulnerabilities have been reported for abuses such as distributing malicious code by Acrobat programs. Adobe applications had become the most popular client-software targets for attackers during the last quarter of 2009.

On September 13, 2006, David Kierznowski provided sample PDF files illustrating JavaScript vulnerabilities. Since at least version 6, JavaScript can be disabled using the preferences menu and embedded URLs that are launched are intercepted by a security warning dialog box to either allow or block the website from activating.

On February 19, 2009, Adobe released a Security Bulletin announcing JavaScript vulnerabilities in Adobe Reader and Acrobat versions 9 and earlier. As a workaround for this issue, US-CERT recommended disabling JavaScript in the affected Adobe products, canceling integration with Windows shell and web browsers (while carrying out an extended version of de-integration for Internet Explorer), deactivating Adobe indexing services and avoiding all PDF files from external sources.

Adobe has identified critical vulnerabilities in Adobe Reader and Acrobat XI (11.0.01 and earlier) for Windows and Macintosh, 9.5.3 and earlier 9.x versions. These vulnerabilities could cause the application to crash and potentially allow an attacker to take control of the affected system. There have been reports of these vulnerabilities being exploited to trick Windows users into clicking on a malicious PDF file delivered in an email message. Adobe recommended users update their product installations.

Adobe has released security updates for Adobe Acrobat and Reader for Windows and Macintosh. These updates address critical vulnerabilities that could potentially allow an attacker to take control of the affected system.

In April 2026, Adobe Inc. released an emergency patch for a zero-day vulnerability in Acrobat and Acrobat Reader, tracked as CVE-2026-34621, which had been actively exploited prior to disclosure. The vulnerability, a prototype pollution flaw enabling arbitrary code execution, was discovered by independent researcher Haifei Li and addressed in version 26.001.21411.

== See also ==
- List of PDF software
- Adobe Acrobat version history
