= History of PDF =

History of the computer file format

The Portable Document Format (PDF) was created by Adobe Systems, introduced at the Windows and OS/2 Conference in January 1993 and remained a proprietary format until it was released as an open standard in 2008. Since then, it has been under the control of an International Organization for Standardization (ISO) committee of industry experts.

Development of PDF began in 1991, when Adobe's co-founder John Warnock wrote a paper for a project then code-named Camelot, in which he proposed the creation of a simplified version of Adobe's PostScript format called Interchange PostScript (IPS). Unlike traditional PostScript, which was tightly focused on rendering print jobs to output devices, IPS would be optimized for displaying pages to any screen and any platform.

PDF was developed to share documents, including text formatting and inline images, among computer users of disparate platforms who may not have access to mutually-compatible application software. It was created by a research and development team called Camelot, which was personally led by Warnock himself. PDF was one of a number of competing electronic document formats in that era such as DjVu, Envoy, Common Ground Digital Paper, Farallon Replica and traditional PostScript itself. In those early years before the rise of the World Wide Web and HTML documents, PDF was popular mainly in desktop publishing workflows.

PDF's adoption in the early days of the format's history was slow. Indeed, the Adobe Board of Directors attempted to cancel the development of the format, as they could see little demand for it. Adobe Acrobat, Adobe's suite for reading and creating PDF files, was not freely available; early versions of PDF had no support for external hyperlinks, reducing its usefulness on the Internet; the larger size of a PDF document compared to plain text required longer download times over the slower modems common at the time; and rendering PDF files was slow on the less powerful machines of the day.

Adobe distributed its Adobe Reader (now Acrobat Reader) program free of charge from version 2.0 onwards, and continued supporting the original PDF, which eventually became the de facto standard for fixed-format electronic documents.

In 2008 Adobe Systems' PDF Reference 1.7 became ISO 32000:1:2008. Thereafter, further development of PDF (including PDF 2.0) is conducted by ISO's TC 171 SC 2 WG 8 with the participation of Adobe Systems and other subject matter experts.

== Adobe specifications ==
From 1993 to 2006 Adobe Systems changed the PDF specification several times to add new features. Various aspects of Adobe's Extension Levels published after 2006 were accepted into working drafts of ISO 32000-2 (PDF 2.0), but developers are cautioned that Adobe's Extensions are not part of the PDF standard.

Version	Edition	Year of publication	New features	Acrobat Reader version support
1.0	First	1993	Text, images, pages, hypertext links, bookmarks, thumbnail sketches	Carousel
1.1	First, revised	1994	Passwords, encryption (MD5, RC4 40bit), device-independent color, threads and links, binary format for smaller files	2.0
1.2	First, revised	1996	Interactive page elements (radio buttons, checkboxes &c); interactive, fill-in forms (AcroForm); Forms Data Format (FDF) for interactive form data that can be imported, exported, transmitted and received from the Web; mouse events; external movie reproduction; external or embedded sound reproduction; zlib/deflate compression of text or binary data; Unicode; advanced color features and image proxying	3.0
1.3	Second	2000	Digital signatures; ICC and DeviceN color spaces; JavaScript actions; embedded file streams of any type (e.g. used for attachments); new annotation types; new features of the Adobe PostScript Language Level 3 imaging model; masked images; alternate representations for images; smooth shading; enhanced page numbering; Web capture, a facility for capturing information from World Wide Web and converting it to PDF; representation of logical structure independently of graphical structure; additional support for CIDFonts; data structures for mapping strings and numbers to PDF objects; information for prepress production workflows support; new functions for several function object types that represent parameterized classes of functions; Acrobat Forms JavaScript Object Specification Version 4.05	4.0
1.4	Third	2001	JBIG2; transparency; RC4 encryption key lengths greater than 40 bits (40–128 bits); enhancements to interactive forms and Forms Data Format (FDF), XML form submissions, embedded FDF files, Unicode specification of field export values, remote collaboration and digital signatures in FDF files; accessibility to disabled users; metadata streams using Extensible Metadata Platform (XMP); tagged PDF; inclusion of printer's marks; display and preview of production-related page boundaries; new predefined CMaps; alternate presentations; importing content from one PDF document into another; EmbeddedFiles entry in the PDF document's name dictionary, a standard location for the embedded data.; Acrobat Forms JavaScript Object Specification Version 4.05	5.0
1.5	Fourth	2003	JPEG 2000; enhanced support for embedding and playback of multimedia; object streams; cross reference streams; XML Forms Data Format (XFDF) for interactive form submission (replaced the XML format in PDF 1.4); support for forms, rich text elements and attributes based on Adobe's XML Forms Architecture (XFA) 2.02 (which defines only static XFA forms); public-key security handlers using PKCS#7 (introduced in PDF 1.3 but not documented in the Reference until 1.5), public-key encryption, permissions, usage rights (UR) signatures (does not require document encryption), PKCS#7 with SHA-1, RSA up to 4096-bits; security handler can use its own encryption and decryption algorithms; document sections selectively viewed or hidden by authors or readers for items such as CAD drawings, layered artwork, maps, and multi-language documents; Alternate Presentations – the only type is slideshow – invoked by means of JavaScript actions (Adobe Reader supports only SVG 1.0); Acrobat JavaScript Scripting Reference, Version 6.0; support for MS Windows 98 dropped.	6.0
1.6	Fifth	2004	3D artwork, e.g. support for Universal 3D file format; OpenType font embedding; support for XFA 2.2 rich text elements and attributes (XFA 2.1 and 2.2 defined for example the following features: dynamic XFA forms, W3C XML digital signatures for XFA, XFA support for Web Services, XFA 'doc-literal' SOAP operations over HTTP, the Web Service's WSDL defines SOAP binding operations, etc.); AES encryption; PKCS#7 with SHA256, DSA up to 4096-bits; NChannel color spaces; additional support for embedded file attachments, including cross-document linking to and from embedded files; enhancements and clarifications to digital signatures related to usage rights and modification detection and prevention signatures; Acrobat JavaScript Scripting Reference, Version 7.0	7.0
1.7 (ISO 32000-1:2008)	Sixth	2006	Increased presentation of 3D artwork; XFA 2.4 rich text elements and attributes; multiple file attachments (portable collections); document requirements for a PDF consumer application; PKCS#7 with SHA384, SHA512 and RIPEMD160; JavaScript for Acrobat API Reference Version 8.0 (the documentation of the objects, properties and methods of the JavaScript extensions for Adobe Acrobat Professional, Acrobat Standard and Adobe Reader)	8
1.7 Adobe Extension Level 1		2008	XFA 2.5 (Extensions Level 1) and XFA 2.6 (Extensions Level 2) (XFA 2.6 defined for example the following features: XFA Secure submit, new profile - XFA Foreground (XFAF) - each page of the XFA form overlays a PDF background, etc.)	8.1
1.7 Adobe Extension Level 3		2008	256-bit AES encryption; incorporation of XFA Datasets into a file conforming PDF/A-2; improved attachment of Adobe Flash applications (SWF), video (including Flash video with H.264), audio, and other multimedia, two-way scripting bridge between Flash player and conforming applications, navigator SWF file may be loaded as an Adobe Flex 2 module or as an ordinary SWF; XFA 2.5 and 2.6 rich text conventions, XFA 2.7 and 2.8 (XFA 2.7 and 2.8 defined for example the following features: Authentication policy for web services, Submit via WSDL/SOAP, locale set typefaces, etc.)	9
1.7 Adobe Extension Level 5		2009	XFA 3.0	9.1
1.7 Adobe Extension Level 6		2009	XFA 3.1	9.1
1.7 Adobe Extension Level 8		2011	XFA 3.3 (e.g. Flash/SWF integration in XFA), AES-256 different password handling than in Extension Level 3, because of a weakness in the password checking algorithm. Specification not published as of November 2014.	X (10)

Adobe declared that it is not producing a PDF 1.8 Reference. Future versions of the PDF Specification will be produced by ISO technical committees. However, Adobe published documents specifying what proprietary extended features for PDF, beyond ISO 32000-1 (PDF 1.7), are supported in its newly released products. This makes use of the extensibility features of PDF as documented in ISO 32000–1 in Annex E.

The specifications for PDF are backward inclusive. The PDF 1.7 specification includes all of the functionality previously documented in the Adobe PDF Specifications for versions 1.0 through 1.6. Where Adobe removed certain features of PDF from their standard, they are not contained in ISO 32000-1 either. Some features are marked as deprecated.

== ISO standardization ==
On January 29, 2007, Adobe announced that it would release the full Portable Document Format 1.7 specification to the American National Standards Institute (ANSI) and the Enterprise Content Management Association (AIIM), for the purpose of publication by the International Organization for Standardization (ISO). By virtue of this change, ISO produces versions of the PDF specification beyond 1.7, and Adobe will be only one of the ISO technical committee members.

ISO standards for "full function PDF" are published under the formal number ISO 32000. Full function PDF specification means that it is not only a subset of Adobe PDF specification; in the case of ISO 32000-1 the full function PDF includes everything defined in Adobe's PDF 1.7 specification. However, Adobe later published extensions that are not part of the ISO standard. There are also proprietary functions in the PDF specification, that are only referenced as external specifications. These were eliminated in PDF 2.0, which includes no proprietary technology.

Version	Year of publication	New feature
1.7 (ISO 32000-1:2008)	2008	The ISO standard ISO 32000-1:2008 and Adobe PDF 1.7 are technically consistent.
2.0 (ISO 32000-2:2017)	2017	Elimination of all proprietary elements, updating, enhancing and clarifying the documentation, and the establishment of tighter rules. PDF 2.0 also includes many new features.
2.0 (ISO 32000-2:2020)	2020	Clarifications, corrections and critical updates to normative references.

PDF documents conforming to ISO 32000-1 carry the PDF version number 1.7. Documents containing Adobe extended features still carry the PDF base version number 1.7 but also contain an indication of which extension was followed during document creation.

PDF documents conforming to ISO 32000-2 carry the PDF version number 2.0, and are known to developers as "PDF 2.0 documents".

=== ISO 32000-1:2008 (PDF 1.7) ===
The final revised documentation for PDF 1.7 was approved by ISO Technical Committee 171 in January 2008 and published as ISO 32000-1:2008 on July 1, 2008, and titled Document management – Portable document format – Part 1: PDF 1.7.

ISO 32000-1:2008 is the first ISO standard for full function PDF. The previous ISO PDF standards (PDF/A, PDF/X, etc.) are subsets intended for more specialized uses. ISO 32000-1 includes all of the functionality previously documented in the Adobe PDF Specifications for versions 1.0 through 1.7. Adobe removed certain features of PDF from previous versions; these features are not contained in PDF 1.7 either.

The ISO 32000-1 document was prepared by Adobe Systems Incorporated based upon PDF Reference, sixth edition, Adobe Portable Document Format version 1.7, November 2006. It was reviewed, edited and adopted under a special fast-track procedure, by ISO Technical Committee 171 (ISO/TC 171), Document management application, Subcommittee SC 2, Application issues, in parallel with its approval by the ISO member bodies.

According to the ISO PDF standard abstract:

ISO 32000-1:2008 specifies a digital form for representing electronic documents to enable users to exchange and view electronic documents independent of the environment they were created in or the environment they are viewed or printed in. It is intended for the developer of software that creates PDF files (conforming writers), software that reads existing PDF files and interprets their contents for display and interaction (conforming readers) and PDF products that read and/or write PDF files for a variety of other purposes (conforming products).

Some proprietary specifications under the control of Adobe Systems (e.g. Adobe Acrobat JavaScript or XML Forms Architecture) are in the normative references of ISO 32000-1 and are indispensable for the application of ISO 32000-1.

=== ISO 32000-2: 2017 (PDF 2.0) ===
A new version of the PDF specification, ISO 32000-2 (PDF 2.0) was published by ISO's TC 171 SC 2 WG 8 Committee in July, 2017. Known in PDF syntax terms as "PDF-2.0", ISO 32000-2 is the first update to the PDF specification developed entirely within the ISO Committee process. The goals of the ISO committee developing PDF 2.0 include evolutionary enhancement and refinement of the PDF language, deprecation of features that are no longer used (e.g. Form XObject names), and standardization of Adobe proprietary specifications (e.g. Adobe JavaScript, Rich Text).

=== ISO 32000-2: 2020 (PDF 2.0) ===
In December 2020, the second edition of PDF 2.0, ISO 32000-2:2020, was published, including clarifications, corrections and critical updates to normative references. ISO 32000-2 does not include any proprietary technologies as normative references.

On April 5, 2023, the PDF Association and its sponsors, Adobe, Apryse and Foxit, made ISO 32000-2 available at no cost.

ISO TC 171 SC 2 working groups have also standardized several extensions to ISO 32000-2 (PDF 2.0):

ISO publication	Year of publication	Title
ISO/TS 24064	2023	Document management — Portable document format — RichMedia annotations conforming to the ISO 10303-242 (STEP AP 242) specification
ISO/TS 32001	2022	Document management — Portable Document Format — Extensions to Hash Algorithm Support in ISO 32000-2 (PDF 2.0)
ISO/TS 32002	2022	Document management — Portable Document Format — Extensions to Digital Signatures in ISO 32000-2 (PDF 2.0)
ISO/TS 32003	2023	Document management — Portable Document Format — Adding support of AES-GCM in PDF 2.0
ISO/TS 32004	2023	Document management — Portable Document Format — Integrity protection in encrypted documents in PDF 2.0
ISO/TS 32005	2023	Document management — Portable Document Format — PDF 1.7 and 2.0 structure namespace inclusion in ISO 32000-2
ISO/TS 32007	2024	Document management — Portable Document Format — RichMedia annotations conforming to glTF assets

=== ISO TC 171 SC 2 WG 8 ===
Formed in 2008 to curate the PDF Reference as an ISO Standard, ISO TC 171 SC 2 Working Group 8 typically meets three times a year, with members from fifteen or more countries attending in person. Attendance is also possible via conference call.

=== ISO standardized subsets of PDF ===
Since 1995, Adobe participated in some of the working groups that create technical specifications for publication by ISO and cooperated within the ISO process on specialized subsets of PDF standards for specific industries and purposes (e.g. PDF/X or PDF/A). The purpose of specialized subsets of the full PDF specification is to remove those functions that are not needed or can be problematic for specific purposes and to require some usage of functions that are only optional (not mandatory) in the full PDF specification.

The following specialized subsets of PDF specification has been standardized as ISO standards (or are in standardization process):

- PDF/X (since 2001 - series of ISO 15929 and ISO 15930 standards) - a.k.a. "PDF for Exchange" - for the Graphic technology - Prepress digital data exchange - (working in ISO Technical committee 130), based on PDF 1.3, PDF 1.4, PDF 1.6 and PDF 2.0 (ISO 32000-2).
- PDF/A (since 2005 - series of ISO 19005 standards) - a.k.a. "PDF for Archive" - Document management - Electronic document file format for long-term preservation (working in ISO Technical committee 171), based on PDF 1.4, PDF 1.7 (ISO 32000-1) and PDF 2.0 (ISO 32000-2).
- PDF/E (since 2008 - ISO 24517) - a.k.a. "PDF for Engineering" - Document management - Engineering document format using PDF (working in ISO Technical committee 171), based on PDF 1.6. The functionality of PDF/E for PDF 2.0 is now included in ISO 19005-4 as PDF/A-4 Conformance Level E.
- PDF/VT (since 2010 - ISO 16612 series) - a.k.a. "PDF for exchange of variable data and transactional (VT) printing" - Graphic technology - Variable data exchange (working in ISO Technical committee 130), based on PDF 1.6 as restricted by PDF/X-4 and PDF/X-5
- PDF/UA (since 2012 - ISO 14289 series) - a.k.a. "PDF for Universal Accessibility" - Document management applications - Electronic document file format enhancement for accessibility (working in ISO Technical committee 171), based on ISO 32000-1 - PDF 1.7
- PDF/R (since 2020 - ISO 23504-1) - a.k.a. "Document management applications — Raster image transport and storage — Part 1: Use of ISO 32000 (PDF/R-1)" (working in ISO Technical committee 171) supports both ISO 32000-1 (PDF 1.7) and ISO 32000-2 (PDF 2.0). Prior to standardization, PDF/R-1 was known as the "PDF/raster" industry specification.
- PDF/VCR (since 2017 - ISO 16613-1) - a.k.a. "Graphic technology — Variable content replacement — Part 1: Using PDF/X for variable content replacement (PDF/VCR-1)" (working in ISO Technical committee 130) supporting both ISO 32000-1 (PDF 1.7) and ISO 32000-2 (PDF 2.0) for template-based variable content substitution workflows.

=== Other standardized subsets of PDF ===
The PDF Association published a subset of PDF called PDF/raster 1.0 in 2017. PDF/raster is intended for storing, transporting and exchanging multi-page raster-image documents, especially scanned documents. PDF/raster was standardized as ISO 23504-1:2020 and is now known as PDF/R-1.

The PDF Association published a subset of PDF called EA-PDF v1.0 in 2025. Built on ISO 19005-3 (PDF/A-3) and ISO 19005-4 (PDF/A-4), EA-PDF defines the "PDF/mail-1" format supporting the long term preservation of email.

In 2026, the PDF Association defined an extension to PDF to support Brotli compression as a new PDF filter.

ISO TC 130 has also standardized the use of XJDF using PDF's document part metadata feature in ISO 21812-1 "Graphic technology — Print product metadata for PDF files — Part 1: Architecture and core requirements for metadata" and application of PDF optional content groups for processing steps in ISO 19593-1 "Graphic technology — Use of PDF to associate processing steps and content data — Part 1: Processing steps for packaging and labels".
