= List of open file formats =

An open file format is a file format for storing digital data, defined by a published specification usually maintained by a standards organization, and which can be used and implemented by anyone. For example, an open format can be implemented by both proprietary and free and open source software, using the typical software licenses used by each. In contrast to open formats, closed formats are considered trade secrets. Open formats are also called free file formats if they are not encumbered by any copyrights, patents, trademarks or other restrictions (for example, if they are in the public domain) so that anyone may use them at no monetary cost for any desired purpose.

Open formats (in alphabetical order) include:

== Multimedia ==
=== Imaging ===
- APNG – It allows for animated PNG files that work similarly to animated GIF files.
- AVIF – An image format using AV1 compression.
- FLIF – Free Lossless Image Format.
- GBR – a 2D binary vector image file format, the de facto standard in the printed circuit board (PCB) industry
- GIF – CompuServe's Graphics Interchange Format (openly published specification, but patent-encumbered by a third party; became free when patents expired in 2004)
- JPEG – a lossy image format widely used to display photographic images, standardized by ISO/IEC
- JPEG 2000 – an image format standardized by ISO/IEC
- JPEG XL – an image format designed to outperform and replace existing formats. Especially legacy JPEG. Supports both lossy and lossless compression.
- MNG – moving pictures, based on PNG
- OpenEXR – a high dynamic range imaging image file format, released as an open standard along with a set of software tools created by Industrial Light and Magic (ILM).
- OpenRaster – a format for raster graphics editors that saves layers
- PNG – a raster image format standardized by ISO/IEC
- QOI – a simple, fast and lossless open source image file format https://qoiformat.org/
- SVG – a vector image format standardized by W3C
- WebP – image format developed by Google
- XPM – image file format used by the X Window System

=== Audio ===
- ALAC – lossless audio codec, previously a proprietary format of Apple Inc.
- FLAC – lossless audio codec
- DAISY Digital Talking Book – a talking book format
- Musepack – an audio codec
- MP3 – lossy audio codec, previously patented
- Ogg – container for Vorbis, FLAC, Speex and Opus (audio formats) & Theora (a video format), each of which is an open format
- Opus – a lossy audio compression format developed by the IETF. Suitable for VoIP, videoconferencing (just audio), music transmission over the Internet and streaming applications (just audio).
- Speex – speech codec
- Vorbis – a lossy audio compression format.
- WavPack – "Hybrid" (lossless/lossy) audio codec

=== Video ===
- AV1
- Dirac – a video compression format supporting both lossless and lossy compression
- Matroska (mkv) – container for all type of multimedia formats (audio, video, images, subtitles)
- WebM – a video/audio container format
- Theora – a lossy video compression format.

=== Various ===
- OBJ - A 3D model/scene format developed by Wavefront Technologies.
- DAE - A 3D model/scene format standardized by Khronos.
- glTF - A 3D model/scene format standardized by Khronos.
- CMML – timed metadata and subtitles
- SMIL – a media playlisting format and multimedia integration language
- VRML/X3D – realtime 3D data formats standardized by ISO/IEC
- XSPF – a playlist format for multimedia

=== Text ===
- Plain text – encoded in numerous non-proprietary encodings, such as ASCII
- CSV – comma-separated values, commonly used for spreadsheets or simple databases
- HTML – HyperText Markup Language (HTML) is the main markup language for creating web pages and other information that can be displayed in a web browser.
- Unicode Transformation Formats – text encodings with support for all common languages and scripts
  - UTF-8 – byte oriented and ASCII compatible
  - UTF-16 – 16-bit oriented
- Markdown – Lightweight markup language that converts to HTML
- DVI – device independent (TeX)
- DocBook – XML-based standard to publish books
- Darwin Information Typing Architecture – adaptable XML-based format for technical documentation, maintained by the OASIS consortium
- ePub – e-book standard by the International Digital Publishing Forum (IDPF)
- FictionBook – XML-based e-book format, which originated and gained popularity in Russia
- LaTeX – document markup language
- Office Open XML – a formatted text format (ISO/IEC 29500:2008); see Licensing for details
- OpenDocument – a formatted text format (ISO/IEC 26300:2006); see Licensing for details
- OpenXPS – open standard for a page description language and a fixed-document format
- PDF started as a proprietary standard. PDF version 1.7 was standardized as ISO 32000-1 in 2008. However, some technologies indispensable for the full implementation of ISO 32000-1 are defined only by Adobe and remain proprietary (e.g. Adobe XML Forms Architecture, Adobe JavaScript). ISO 32000-2:2017 (PDF 2.0) does not include these dependencies. Various subsets of PDF have been standardized to meet a variety of needs, including ISO 15930 (PDF/X), ISO 19005 (PDF/A), ISO 14829 (PDF/UA) and ISO 24517 (PDF/E). The PDF Association has also standardized PDF/raster).
- PostScript – a page description language and programming language, started as a proprietary standard but is now a public specification.
- XHTML – XHTML (Extensible HyperText Markup Language) is a family of XML markup languages that mirror or extend versions of the widely used Hypertext Markup Language (HTML), the language in which web pages are written.
- ZIM – a file format that stores wiki content for offline usage.

== Archiving and compression ==
- 7z – for archiving and/or compression
- B1 – for archiving and/or compression
- bzip2 – for compression
- gzip – for compression
- lzip – for compression
- MAFF – for web page archiving, based on ZIP
- PAQ – for compression
- SQX – for archiving and/or compression
- tar – for archiving
- xz – for compression
- ZIP – for archiving and/or compression; the base format is in the public domain, but newer versions have some patented features

== Other ==
- CSS – style sheet format usually used with (X)HTML, standardized by W3C
- DjVu – file format for scanned images or documents
- EAS3 – binary file format for floating point data
- ELF – Executable and Linkable Format
- FreeOTFE – container for encrypted data
- GPX – GPs eXchange format – for describing waypoints, tracks and routes
- HDF – multi-platform data format for storing multidimensional arrays, among other data structures
- HTML/XHTML – markup language for web pages (ISO/IEC 15445:2000)
- iCalendar – calendar data format
- IFC – data model describing building and construction industry data
- JSON – object notation, subset of YAML and correct ECMAScript statement
- LTFS – Linear Tape File System
- LUKS – disk-encryption specification originally intended for Linux
- NetCDF – data format for multidimensional arrays
- NZB – for multipart binary files on Usenet
- RDF - graph based data model standardized by W3C, includes 7 standard serializations, N-Triples, N-Quads, Turtle, TriG, RDF/XML, JSON-LD and RDFa
- RSS – syndication
- SDXF – the Structured Data eXchange Format
- SFV – checksum format
- Thing Description – file format for W3C Web of Things data models
- TrueCrypt – discontinued container for encrypted data
- WOFF – font file format used in webpages
- XCF – GIMP project file
- XML – a general-purpose markup language, standardized by W3C
- YAML – human readable data serialization format
