= LuraTech =

Digital document software company

LuraTech Imaging GmbH
- Company type: limited-liability company
- Industry: electronic document processing
- Founded: 1995 in Berlin, Germany
- Founder: Carsten Heiermann
- Headquarters: Willy-Brandt-Platz 1, Remscheid, Germany
- Key people: Carsten Heiermann (CEO)
- Products: PDF Compressor; PDF SDK; DocYard; ZUGFeRD Extraction SDK; Mobile PDF
- Number of employees: ~25
- Divisions: LuraTech Europe GmbH; LuraTech Solutions GmbH; LuraTech, Inc.; LuraTech Ltd.
- Website: www.luratech.com

LuraTech is a software company, owned since 2015 by Foxit Software, with offices in Remscheid, Berlin, London, and in the United States, which makes products for handling and conversion of digital documents. Its customers are primarily organizations involved in long-term document archiving and scan service providers. It is a member of the PDF Association.

LuraTech was founded as a part of a joint project with Technische Universität Berlin intended to bring wavelet compression techniques to digital still images. LuraTech developed a segmentation technology to deal with scanned documents containing mixed raster content (MRC), resulting in the creation of LuraDocument LDF, a proprietary document format for the compression of scanned documents. Since then, LuraTech has developed several software development kits (SDKs) and computer applications for creating and handling PDF documents. LuraTech has also taken part in the development of the JPEG 2000 standard.

In 2002 LuraTech created the PDF Compressor, applying the concepts of MRC layered document compression to PDF standards, especially PDF/A. This was the first workflow solution that LuraTech built on top of its software development kits.

In 2010 LuraTech launched DocYard, a software platform to create and centrally manage general document and data conversion processes.

At the 2013 CeBIT conference, LuraTech announced the release of its ZUGFeRD Extraction SDK, a toolkit for ERP and online banking software developers, which facilitates processing of PDF invoices standardized under the Central User Guidelines for Electronic Billing in Germany (ZUGFeRD).

In 2015 LuraTech released LuraTech PDF Scanner iOS, a freely-available iPhone/iPad app for convenient creating and editing of highly compressed PDF documents.

In October 2015 LuraTech was acquired by Foxit Software.
