= IText =

PDF file program

iText
- Developer: iText Group NV
- Release: 2000
- Stable release: 9.7.1 / July 22, 2026; 21 days ago
- Written in: Java, C#
- Operating system: Cross-platform
- Type: Library
- License: AGPLv3; Proprietary; MPL (versions prior to iText 5 and 4.2.x)
- Website: itextpdf.com
- Repository: https://github.com/itext/

iText is a library for creating and manipulating PDF files in Java and .NET. It was created in 2000 and written by Bruno Lowagie. The source code was initially distributed as open source under the Mozilla Public License or the GNU Library General Public License open source licenses. However, as of version 5.0.0 (released Dec 7, 2009) and version 4.2.0 (released Jul 10, 2015) it is distributed under the GNU Affero General Public License version 3. A fork of the LGPL/MPL licensed version of iText is currently being actively maintained as the OpenPDF library on GitHub. iText is also available through a proprietary license, distributed by iText Software NV.

iText provides support for advanced PDF features such as PKI-based signatures, 40-bit and 128-bit encryption, colour correction, Tagged PDF, PDF forms (AcroForms), PDF/X, colour management via ICC profiles, and barcodes, and is used by several products and services. Eclipse BIRT and Jasper Reports switched to the fork OpenPDF.

== History ==
iText (formerly known as rugPDF) was developed in the winter of 1998 as an in-house project at Ghent University to create PDF document applications for student administration. Preliminary versions could only initially read and write PDF files, and they required developers to be knowledgeable of PDF syntax, objects, operators, and operands to work with the library. Leonard Rosenthol, PDF Architect at Adobe, lists iText as one of the early milestones in the history of the openness of PDF.

In 1999, Lowagie disbanded the rugPDF code and wrote a new library named iText. Lowagie created iText as a library that Java developers could use to create PDF documents without knowing PDF syntax and released it as a Free and Open Source Software (FOSS) product on February 14, 2000. In the summer of 2000, Paulo Soares joined the project and is now considered one of the main developers.

In late 2008, iText became available for proprietary license, and in early 2009, iText Software Corp. was formed to be the worldwide licensor of iText products.

iText has since been ported to the .NET Framework under the name iTextSharp, written in C#. While it has a separate code base, it is synchronised to the main iText release schedule.

== ISO standards support ==
iText adheres to most modern-day PDF standards, including:

- ISO 32000-1 (PDF 1.7)
- ISO 32000-2 (PDF-2.0)
- ISO 19005-1 (PDF/A-1)
- ISO 19005-2 (PDF/A-2)
- ISO 19005-3 (PDF/A-3)
- ISO 19005-4 (PDF/A-4)
- ISO 14289-1 (PDF/UA-1)
- ISO 14289-2 (PDF/UA-2)

=== Extensions on ISO 32000-2 ===
- ISO 32001
- ISO 32002
- ISO 32003
- ISO 32004

== Licensing ==
iText was originally released under the MPL/LGPL. On December 1, 2009, with the release of iText 5, the license was switched to the GNU Affero General Public License version 3. Projects that did not want to provide their source code (as required by the AGPL) could either purchase a commercial license to iText 5 or continue using previous versions or a fork of iText under the MPL/LGPL.

iText Group NV claims that during the due diligence process to prepare for iText 5, several IP issues with iText 2 were discovered and fixed.

== Forks ==
- OpenPDF is an active open source project released under LGPL and MPL. It has been forked from IText svn tag 4.2.0 and is implemented in Java.

== Commendations and Awards ==
In 2007, SOA World Magazine listed iText as "One of the ten open-source solutions enterprises should be using." James Gosling praised the iText library, using it in a new edition of Huckster.

In 2011, iText was featured at Devoxx, a community conference for Java developers.

In 2013, Deloitte nominated the iText Software Group for the Technology Fast 50 Award in the Benelux. The company was ranked 10th in the Benelux and 3rd in Belgium.

In 2014, iText won the BelCham Entrepreneurship Award in the category "Most Promising Company of the Year" and Deloitte recognized iText Group NV as the fastest growing technology company in Belgium. Subsequently, the company was ranked #28 in Deloitte's Technology Fast 500 in the EMEA region. iText was also featured on the PDF Days in Cologne, Washington DC and New York, on Java One in San Francisco, and on Devoxx in Antwerp.

In 2017, iText won the International Business Awards "Most Innovative Tech Company of the Year - under 100 employees 2017".

In 2017/18, the ITEXT GROUP won "The ELITE Award for Growth Strategy of the Year".

In 2019, iText won a Silver Stevie in the American Business Awards for "Most Innovative Tech Company of the Year - under 100 employees". iText was also a National Winner of "Growth Strategy of the Year" at the European Business Awards.

== See also ==
- List of PDF software
