= Solid Documents =

Solid Documents Limited
- Company type: Private
- Industry: Software
- Founded: 2001
- Headquarters: Nelson, New Zealand
- Area served: Worldwide
- Key people: Michael Cartwright (CEO)
- Products: Solid Converter PDF and other document productivity software
- Website: SolidDocuments.com

Solid Documents is a global productivity software company which creates document reconstruction and archival resources for businesses and individual consumers. Most notably, the same technology used by its Solid Framework SDK is licensed by Adobe for Acrobat X.

== History ==
Established in Redmond, Washington in 2001, Solid Documents, LLC was founded by CEO Michael Cartwright with the goal of becoming the leader in document productivity software. Cartwright leveraged his extensive software development, document management, internationalization, and localization experience to establish an organization with the vision of the Portable Document Format (PDF) as the universally-acceptable, standardized format for document interchange.

Partnering with the PDF Association in 2008, Solid Documents assisted in the creation of a series of standardized tests used to ensure compliance of PDF/A validators and converters with ISO 19005-1 archival standards. Shortly after these standardized compliance tests were created, the company began offering a free service to analyze PDF documents and provide feedback on whether or not they comply with ISO 19005-1 archival standards.

In 2011, co-founders Tamara and Michael Cartwright relocated to the south island of New Zealand establishing a base of operations as Solid Documents Limited from management offices in Nelson, New Zealand.

== Products ==
=== Solid Converter PDF ===
The company's flagship product, Solid Converter PDF, was released in 2003 and has been translated into 15 languages and distributed in over 60 countries. This product allows documents to be converted into and out of PDF and securely archived in accordance with ISO standards. The last major update to this product, version 10.1, was released in May 2021 and included functionality improvements for better reconstruction enhancements and editing of output.

Solid PDF to Word for Mac (renamed to Solid Converter Mac in 2015) was released in April 2010 allowing Apple users to manipulate documents out of PDF into Word, Excel, PowerPoint, HTML, text, or iWork formats. An updated version 2 of the tool was released to Mac users in September 2013. Solid Converter Mac version 2.1 was updated in May 2021 to include all the improvements included in Solid Framework.

=== Solid PDF Tools ===
In 2007, Solid Documents released Solid Converter PDF version 3.0 and launched Solid PDF Tools, a premium product which included scanning and archival features in addition to conversion. Both products were a departure from the previous dialog box-focused user interface by offering a distinctly WYSIWYG user experience. Version 4.0 released in 2008, adding language localization for French, Spanish, and Chinese users as well conversion to and from additional formats like Excel, PowerPoint, and HTML. In December 2010 version 7.0 was released with continued product enhancements including selective conversion, table and workflow improvements. Version 9.0 released in June 2014 increases the number of languages supported by the OCR technology and includes a number of conversion and reconstruction improvements. Version 10.1 was released in May 2021 and includes all improvements that are in Solid Documents' Solid Framework SDK.

=== Solid Framework SDK ===
In September 2010, Solid Documents entered into a strategic partnership with activePDF, Inc. licensing Solid Framework SDK to convert PDFs into a variety of editable formats, in addition to PDF/A validation and conversion already existing in their activePDF DocConverter™ product. Later that year in November 2010, Adobe Inc. licensed Solid Framework SDK for Adobe Acrobat X and has continued this partnership with its most recent product, Acrobat DC. By harnessing the Solid Framework PDF to Word, PowerPoint, and Excel conversion capabilities, Acrobat users are able to reliably repurpose PDF content. In June 2014 an update to version 9.0 was released which provides enhanced flexibility for application development with the SDK. Version 10 of Solid Framework SDK was released in October 2018. The Solid Framework SDK is updated with reconstruction improvements on a continual basis. Details can be found at https://solidframework.net/release-notes/
