= PDFA =

PDFA may refer to:

- Partnership for a Drug-Free America, now known as Partnership to End Addiction: a non-profit organization which runs campaigns against teenage drug abuse in the United States.
- PDF Association, organisation that promotes the adoption and use of International Standards related to PDF technology

== See also ==
- PDF/A, ISO-standardized version of the PDF, specialized for the digital preservation of electronic documents
