= Foxit Software =

Software company which develops a PDF reader

Fujian Foxit Software Development Joint Stock Co., Ltd.
- Native name: 福建福昕软件开发股份有限公司
- Type: Public
- Traded as: SSE: 688095
- Industry: Software
- Founded: 2001
- Founder: Eugene Y. Xiong
- Headquarters: Fuzhou, China
- Area served: Worldwide
- Key people: Eugene Y. Xiong (Chairman and Founder), George Z Gao (CEO), Jeremy Wei (CTO)
- Products: PDF software (Foxit PDF Reader) and development kits
- Owner: Eugene Y. Xiong (38.48%)
- Number of employees: Over 650 worldwide
- Subsidiaries: Foxit Software Inc.; Foxit Europe GmbH; Foxit Australia Pty Ltd; Foxit Japan K.K.; DocuSavvy Technologies Limited; eSign Genie Software Private Limited
- Website: www.foxit.com

Fujian Foxit Software Development Joint Stock Co., Ltd. (Chinese: 福建福昕软件开发股份有限公司), also known as Foxit Software (Chinese: 福昕软件), is a software developer based in Fuzhou, China, with subsidiaries in the United States, Europe, Japan, and Australia, that develops Portable Document Format (PDF) software and tools used to create, edit, eSign, and secure files and digital documents. It also has other offices in Fuzhou, Beijing, Berlin, South Yarra (Melbourne), Japan, Taiwan, Korea, France, North Macedonia, and Slovakia.

As of 2016, there were about 425 million Foxit users of Foxit's software, with sales to more than 100,000 customers in 200 countries.

Foxit Software was named "#2 Best PDF Editor Software of 2022" by ComHQ.

== History ==
Foxit Software was founded in 2001 by Eugene Y. Xiong (Chinese: 熊雨前), a Chinese national with permanent residence in the United States, to develop similar PDF software products to those from Adobe Systems and other PDF vendors, and offer them at lower prices. In 2009, Foxit Software Company incorporated as Foxit Corporation.

In December 2015, Foxit went public on the Chinese over-the-counter market NEEQ. Before 2019, Amazon was an early investor and substantial shareholder of Foxit, once owning 12.38% of the latter's shares, before divesting in 2019 to make Foxit eligible for a simplified IPO process for domestic companies in China.

In June 2020, Foxit Software received permission to list in the Shanghai Stock Exchange STAR Market (the Sci-Tech Innovation Board). According to Foxit's pre-IPO disclosures, it seeks to raise RMB 409 million (approximately USD 49 million).

As a technology company, Foxit is eligible to receive a reduced tax rate of 15% in China. It also received RMB 13 million of Chinese government subsidies in 2019. As of 2019, most of Foxit's software development has been taking place within China, while over 90% of its revenue was earned outside of China, in markets such as the United States, Europe, Japan and Australia. The vast majority of its net profit is sourced from the United States. It listed Adobe Inc. as its biggest competitor.

=== Acquisitions ===
Foxit has grown organically and through several acquisitions.

Company	Date of close
Dataintro	August 2014
LuraTech (renamed Foxit Europe)	October 2015
Debenu (renamed Foxit Australia)	March 2016
Sumilux	July 2016
CVISION Technologies (merged with Foxit Software Inc.)	August 2017
eSignGenie	October 2021

=== Standards involvement ===
Foxit has contributed to the evolution of ISO 32000 and ISO 19005 standards.

== Products ==
Product name	Formerly	Platform
PDF Editor Pro	Foxit PhantomPDF Business	Windows, macOS, Web, iOS, Android, and Chromebooks
PDF Editor	Foxit PhantomPDF Standard, Foxit PhantomPDF Online, Foxit PhantomPDF Mac, Foxit PDF Reader Mobile (with optional in-product purchases)	Windows, macOS, Web, iOS, Android, and Chromebooks
PDF Reader	Foxit Reader, Foxit PDF Reader Mobile	Windows, macOS, Web, iOS, Android, and Chromebooks
Foxit eSign	Foxit Sign	see features
Volume Automation	PDF Compressor, Rendition Server, Digital Transformation Services, Maestro Server OCR	Web, Windows, Linux
PDF SDK	N/A	Web, Windows, Mac, Linux, Android, iOS, Universal Windows Platform (UWS)

=== Foxit Reader ===
The company's first product, Foxit Reader, was released in 2004. It provides a way to view, create and sign PDF files, and add annotations to them. Foxit Reader 3.0 offers comparable functionality to Adobe Reader. Older versions were notable for their speed and small file sizes. Foxit released version 8.0 in 2016. The software is pre-installed on Windows PCs from HP, Acer, and ASUS. Foxit released version 9.0 in 2017. The software is available as a freeware download for PCs running Windows 7 (or later), MacOS and older versions of Linux.

The Foxit installer was bundled with potentially unwanted programs like the Ask Toolbar and OpenCandy which installed the browser-hijacking malware Conduit.

In July 2014, the Internet Storm Center reported that the mobile version for iPhone was transmitting unencrypted telemetry and other data to remote servers located in China despite users attempting to opt out of such data collection.

=== Foxit PhantomPDF ===
Foxit PhantomPDF, a multi-feature PDF editor, was released in 2008. Foxit PhantomPDF has an interface that holds many advanced PDF editing and security features. Foxit released version 8.0 in 2016. The software has been renamed from Foxit PhantomPDF to Foxit PDF Editor with the release of Foxit PDF Editor 11.0.0.49893 dated May 25, 2021.

=== ConnectedPDF ===
ConnectedPDF, released in 2016, extends the traditional portable document format by associating a unique identifier with each PDF, thereby enabling capabilities such as file update notifications, document locating and tracking, shared and synchronized review and mark-up, and remote digital rights management and protection. ConnectedPDF is not a stand-alone product. Functionality is embedded within some of Foxit's PDF software products. ConnectedPDF is included in the latest releases of Foxit PhantomPDF (version ≥8), Foxit Reader (version ≥8) and Foxit MobilePDF (version ≥5).

=== PDF Compressor ===
Foxit PDF Compressor converts scanned documents to PDF or PDF/A, compresses them and uses integrated OCR technology to make them fully text searchable.

=== Rendition Server ===
Foxit Rendition Server is an on-premises or cloud web service for centralized document conversion to PDF and PDF/A. It enables the construction of a transformation infrastructure which can be addressed by programs and environments through a web service interface.

=== OEM relationships ===
The company has developed original equipment manufacturer relationships with a number of businesses. Foxit's technology is included in Amazon Kindle, Gmail and Google Chrome. The company has also developed the rendering engine for Google's open-source PDFium project.

=== SDKs ===
Foxit also provides a variety of PDF software development kits (SDKs) for developers wanting to create custom PDF applications.

== Industry association memberships ==
Foxit Software is an active member of the PDF Association. LuraTech, acquired by Foxit in 2015, was a founding member of the PDF Association. Carsten Heiermann, founder and CEO of the LuraTech group, is member of the association's board. Thomas Zellmann, who joined LuraTech in 2001, is the association's Managing Director.

== See also ==
- List of PDF software
- eSign
