= Solid PDF Tools =

- Developer: Apryse
- Stable release: 9, build 366 (Windows)
- Operating system: Windows 10, 11 Discontinued: Windows 7 (2024); Windows 8, 8.1 (2023); Windows XP, Vista (2019)
- Size: 121.1 MB (Windows)
- Available in: Multilingual
- Type: PDF Tools
- License: Proprietary commercial software
- Website: apryse.com/brands/soliddocuments

Solid PDF Tools is a document reconstruction software product which allows users to convert PDFs into editable documents and create PDFs from a variety of file sources. The same technology used in the software's Solid Framework SDK is licensed by Adobe for Acrobat X

== Features ==
Solid PDF Tools supports conversion from the following formats into PDF:

- Microsoft Word .docx and .doc
- Rich text format .rtf
- Microsoft Excel .xlsx
- .xml
- Microsoft PowerPoint .pptx
- .html
- Plain text .txt

Solid PDF Tools recognizes columns, can remove headers, footers and image graphics and can extract flowing text content. Selective content extraction is supported, allowing the conversion of specific text, tables, or images from a PDF file while also providing for the combination of multiple PDF tables into a single Excel worksheet.

Batching is supported for converting multiple PDF documents at the same time or for combining multiple PDF documents into a single file and compression options allow users to reduce the size of a PDF, optimizing it for a variety of media.

=== PDF Creation ===
PDFs can be created either from an application’s print function or through Solid PDF Tool’s drag-and-drop WYSIWYG interface. Users are also able to document properties, permissions, and passwords upon creation.

=== Scanning, Archiving ===
Solid PDF Tools users may scan a paper document into a PDF/A-1b file for archiving purposes and by relying upon built-in Microsoft Office Document Imaging (MODI) Optical Character Recognition (OCR) software, the document becomes keyword searchable. The software converts existing PDF documents into PDF/A-1b files which make them searchable, consistent, and archivable providing PDF/A validation compliance to make sure they reproduce similarly in the future.

=== Editing ===
Solid PDF Tools allows users to edit PDFs by adding custom watermarks and moving page orders. It will also detect hyperlinks and has text mark-up recovery.

== History ==
Originally launched in 2003 by Solid Documents, Solid PDF Tools has become known as an alternative to Adobe® Acrobat® and utilized by businesses worldwide. In August 2008, version 2.0 included user interfaces for French, Chinese, and Spanish languages. In December 2010, version 7 was released offering several feature enhancements including the ability to convert PDF files into .docx, .xlsx or .pptx formats without requiring the user to have Microsoft Office. Additional features include table formatting improvements, text mark-up recovery, and extraction from PDF to .csv files. Version 9.0 allows scanned PDF data recovery into Microsoft Excel, offers improved conversion technology, and feature integration.

In August 2021, Solid Documents was purchased by Apryse. Since then, Apryse has incorporated the Solid Documents technology into their core platform.

== See also ==
- List of PDF software
