= A mode =

A mode may refer to:

- A mode (photography), aperture priority mode in electronically controlled cameras
- PDF/A mode, an (archival) variant of the PDF file format
- Mode A, a transponder mode in aviation
- A-Mode of ultrasound imaging and therapeutic ultrasound
