= Envoy (WordPerfect) =

Portable document file format

- Filename extension: .evy
- Internet media type: application/x-envoy
- Developed by: Tumbleweed Communications Corporation
- Initial release: 1993
- Type of format: Document file format

In computing, Envoy was a proprietary portable document file format marketed by WordPerfect Corporation, created as a competitor for Acrobat Pro. It was introduced by Tumbleweed Communications Corporation in 1993 and shipped with WordPerfect Office in March 1994.

An Envoy file could be created by the use of a special printer driver in WordPerfect, and an application for "viewing, manipulating, annotating or printing Envoy files" was included in the WordPerfect Envoy product, together with a "runtime file" that permitted a viewer to be embedded in Envoy files and enable recipients to have "all the functionality of the full viewer without paying licensing charges". The resulting document could be viewed in a separate viewer application, the Envoy Distributable Viewer, which also worked as a web browser plugin.

In contrast to Adobe PDF, the Envoy file format was not publicly documented. Envoy failed to make any headway against PDF, and is now largely unused. Some users have reported partial success in accessing Envoy documents by printing them to PostScript via the Distributable Viewer and then converting the resulting files to PDF format. These PostScript files can also be viewed using applications such as Ghostscript.
