= Solid Converter PDF =

- Developer: Solid Documents
- Stable release: Windows: 9.0 (build 366) / June 18, 2014; 12 years ago Mac: 2.1 (build 5140.41) / November 1, 2014; 11 years ago
- Operating system: Windows 10, 11; Mac OS X v10.7+
- Size: 121.06 MB (Windows); 45.4 MB (Mac OS X)
- Available in: Multilingual
- Type: PDF Converter
- License: Proprietary commercial software
- Website: www.soliddocuments.com

Solid Converter PDF is document reconstruction software from Solid Documents which converts PDF files to editable formats. Originally released for the Microsoft Windows operating system, a Mac OS X version was released in 2010. The current versions are Solid Converter PDF 9.0 for Windows and Solid PDF to Word for Mac 2.1. The same technology used by the product's Solid Framework SDK is licensed by Adobe for Acrobat X.

== History ==
By the second version's release in early 2004, Solid Converter PDF was noted for its focus on editing and recapturing content from previously-inaccessible PDF files. The release of v4 in May 2008 introduced a transition away from its original wizard interface to a WYSIWYG user interface, allowing for direct editing of PDFs. In December 2010, release of version 7 included several product feature enhancements including table editing and workflow improvements, recover text markup, extract PDF to .csv, and selective conversion. Version 8.0 released in early 2013 includes a simplified user interface and a Microsoft Word ribbon add-in which allows users to quickly access the scan to Word feature. Relying on multi-core processors, performance has been improved for batch file conversions and time intensive OCR. Focusing on feature integration and conversion improvements, version 9.0 released in June 2014 adds data recovery from scanned PDFs into Microsoft Excel.

== Features ==
Solid Converter PDF's supported conversion formats include Microsoft Word .docx and .doc, .rtf, Microsoft Excel .xlsx, .xml, Microsoft PowerPoint .pptx, .html and .txt. Besides converting PDF files to document file formats for editing, users may also edit PDFs directly in the program. It preserves the original layout and formatting during conversion and emphasizes a simple, easy-to-use interface. Other features include table recovery, hyperlink detection, adding watermarks, rearranging pages, and PDF creation. Version 7 no longer requires Microsoft Office to be installed to convert to Office Open XML formats. Version 9.0 includes conversion improvements, legacy driver support, integrated features, and less comples XML output.

== Mac OS X version ==
Solid Documents released Solid PDF to Word for Mac, its first product for the Mac OS X operating system, in April 2010, and an updated version was released in November 2014 to include support for OS X 10.10 (Yosemite). It has many of the same features as Solid Converter PDF including conversion to Word and Excel formats, page layout preservation, OCR, and batch conversion. Unlike the Windows version, Solid PDF to Word is able to convert to iWork Pages format and utilizes an Open File dialog interface (similar to early Solid Converter PDF incarnations) instead of the full WYSIWYG editor. System requirements include Mac OS X v10.7 or later and iWork to convert to .pages format.

== See also ==
- List of PDF software
