= OpenPDF =

Java library

- Developer: https://github.com/LibrePDF/OpenPDF/graphs/contributors
- Initial release: 2017
- Stable release: 3.0.0 / 17 August 2025; 3 months ago
- Repository: github.com/LibrePDF/OpenPDF
- Written in: Java
- Operating system: Cross-platform
- Type: Library
- License: LGPL V2.1 & MPL V2; Open-source software
- Website: librepdf.github.io/OpenPDF/

OpenPDF is a free Java library for creating and editing PDF files with the Mozilla Public License and the GNU Library General Public License free software license. It is a fork of iText, created because the license of iText was changed from LGPL / MPL to a dual AGPL and proprietary license in order for the original authors to sell a proprietary version of the software.

Version 3.0.0 was released August 17, 2025. This version changed the Java package name to org.openpdf, and also includes new modules for HTML to PDF, and PDF rendering.

== See also ==
- List of PDF software
