= ODTTF =

Embedded font file type

- Filename extension: .odttf
- Internet media type: application/vnd.openxmlformats-officedocument.obfuscatedFont
- Developed by: Microsoft
- Type of format: Font
- Extended from: OpenType

ODTTF (Obfuscated OpenType) is an embedded font file type used in Microsoft's Open XML Paper Specification (XPS) and Office Open XML formats. The file type refers to an obfuscated subsetted font based on the fonts used in the original document. Its MIME type is application/vnd.openxmlformats-officedocument.obfuscatedFont.

The files can be extracted from the DOCX file by changing the filename extension to .zip, so the archive can be browsed and extracted. The MIME type is Microsoft's own invention and has not been submitted to the IANA registry.

According to the source code of Okular (see function parseGUID() and method XpsFile::loadFontByName()), the first 32 bytes of the font file are obfuscated by XOR using the font file name (a GUID). The rest of the file is normal OpenType. The byte order of the GUID representation is reversed from the formatted form as used in the filename and does not coincide with the internal byte order of the representation in the .NET Framework.
