= Foxit PDF Reader =

Freemium PDF tool

- Foxit Reader on Windows 11
- Developer: Foxit Software
- Stable release: 2026.1.1.36485 (April 27, 2026; 14 days ago) [±]
- Operating system: Windows 10; Windows 11; macOS (10.15 or higher); iOS (11.0 or higher); Android (4.4 or higher); Citrix
- Size: Around 200 MB
- Available in: English, French, German, Italian, Portuguese, Russian, Spanish and 35 other languages
- Type: Desktop publishing software
- License: Proprietary: Reader: Freeware; MobilePDF: Freeware
- Website: www.foxitsoftware.com/pdf-reader/

Foxit PDF Reader (formerly Foxit Reader) is a multilingual freemium PDF (Portable Document Format) tool that can create, view, edit, digitally sign, and print PDF files. Foxit Reader is developed by Fuzhou, China-based Foxit Software. Early versions of Foxit Reader were notable for startup performance and small file size. Foxit v3.0 was found to be comparable to Adobe Reader. The Windows version allows annotating and saving unfinished PDF forms, FDF import/export, converting to text, highlighting, and drawing. Until version 9.7.2 Foxit Reader had PDF creation features, including a "Foxit PDF Printer" for Windows, allowing all programs to "print" output to PDF; they were removed in May 2020 from later versions. Foxit PDF Reader also includes an Enterprise version, which requires a Foxit account.

== Supported platforms ==
Foxit Software adds support for new platforms, and withdraws ones considered obsolete. Microsoft operating systems from Windows 95, Windows Mobile (CE), Windows RT, and Windows Phone were all supported, but have been discontinued. Systems currently supported are reported on the Foxit Website, and include versions of Windows, Mac OS, and older versions of Linux. Mobile versions are available for telephones and tablets running Android and Apple iOS. Foxit's PDF Reader is also available online via the Foxit cloud service, but only when bundled with Foxit PDF Editor.

== Issues ==
The Foxit installer was bundled with potentially unwanted programs like the Ask Toolbar and OpenCandy which installed the browser-hijacking malware Conduit.

In July 2014, the Internet Storm Center reported that the mobile version for iPhone was transmitting unencrypted telemetry and other data to remote servers located in China despite users attempting to opt out of such data collection.

Versions of Foxit Reader up to 9.7.2 added a "Foxit PDF printer" to Windows; this allowed any program to send its printable output to a PDF file. This was removed in later versions, an action much criticised by users. On 9 June 2021 Foxit said "Foxit PDF Printer will not be added in Foxit Reader in the foreseeable future", and suggested using Foxit PDF Editor for PDF creation. Ways to extract the PDF printer from an older version were published. Alternatively, Foxit PDF printer can also be installed directly from the link provided by Foxit Support.

== See also ==
- List of PDF software
