= PDF/E =

File format

- Filename extension: .pdf
- Internet media type: application/pdf
- Type code: 'PDF ' (including a single space)
- Magic number: %PDF-
- Developed by: ISO
- Extended from: PDF
- Standard: ISO 24517

ISO 24517-1:2008 is an ISO Standard published in 2008.

- Document management—Engineering document format using PDF—Part 1: Use of PDF 1.6 (PDF/E-1)

This standard defines a format (PDF/E) for the creation of documents used in geospatial, construction and manufacturing workflows and is based on the PDF Reference version 1.6 from Adobe Systems. The specification also supports interactive media, including animation and 3D.

PDF/E is a subset of PDF, designed to be an open and neutral exchange format for engineering and technical documentation. For PDF 2.0, PDF/E-1 is superseded by the PDF/A-4e conformance level.

== Description ==
The PDF/E Standard specifies how the Portable Document Format (PDF) should be used for the creation of documents in engineering workflows.

Key benefits of PDF/E include:

- Reduces requirements for expensive & proprietary software
- Lower storage and exchange costs (vs. paper)
- Trustworthy exchange across multiple applications and platforms
- Self-contained
- Cost-effective and accurate means of capturing markups
- Developed and maintained by the PDF/E ISO committee

The Standard does not define a method for the creation or conversion from paper or electronic documents to the PDF/E format.

The Committee managing ISO 24517 (PDF/E) needs subject-matter experts to assist in the development of Part 2 of the Standard.

ISO 24517 (PDF/E) was created to meet the needs of organizations who need to reliably create, exchange and review engineering documentation, however, the first part of the standard does not address 3D, video or other dynamic content, nor does it address integrated source data.

== See also ==
- PDF
- PDF/A
- PDF/UA
- PDF/VT
- PDF/X
