= NPES =

American trade association

NPES, The Association for Suppliers of Printing, Publishing and Converting Technologies, is a trade association based in the United States representing more than four hundred companies that manufacture and distribute equipment, systems, software, and supplies used in printing, publishing, and converting.

== History ==
The Association was founded as the National Printing Equipment Association in 1933 in response to the U.S. government's call for industries to organize to develop codes of fair practice to promote economic recovery during the Great Depression. The 26 charter member companies included manufacturers of printing presses, bindery equipment, typesetting machinery and specialty equipment.

In 1939, NPEA held its first print exhibition in the US at the 1939 New York World's Fair. In 1977, the NPEA office was moved to Washington, DC, and the next year the organization's name was changed to NPES – National Printing Equipment and Supply Association.

In 1982, GASC (the Graphic Arts Show Company) was jointly formed by NPES, PIA (the Printing Industries of America), and NAPL (the National Association of Printing Leadership) to organize and manage the industry's GRAPH EXPO trade show. The organization changed its name once again in 1991, becoming NPES The Association for Suppliers of Printing and Publishing Technologies. In 1998 NPES adopted its fourth and current name, adding “Converting” in recognition of the organization's representation of that industry segment.

== NPES Today ==
Today, the Association represents manufacturers, importers, and distributors of equipment, supplies, systems, and software used in every printing, publishing, and converting process from design to distribution. Virtually all industry products and processes are represented by member companies, which range in size from under $1 million in annual sales revenue to more than $1 billion.

NPES member services include informational publications, statistical, safety, marketing, and education data and programs, government affairs representation, safety and technical standards development coordination (national and international), and international trade assistance.

Now based in Reston, VA, the NPES headquarters also house the offices of the Graphic Arts Show Company (GASC). GASC events include the international PRINT show and the national GRAPH EXPO exhibition.

Residing at the same location are the offices of the Graphic Arts Education and Research Foundation (GAERF). GAERF was created in 1983 by NAPL, NPES, and PIA to channel a portion of the revenues earned by GASC–managed shows into educational initiatives supporting a strong future for the industry.
