= Font embedding =

Inclusion of font files inside an electronic document

Font embedding is the inclusion of font files inside an electronic document for display across different platforms. Font embedding is controversial because it allows licensed fonts to be freely distributed.

== History ==
Font embedding has been possible with Portable Document Format (PDF), Microsoft Word for Windows and some other applications for many years. LibreOffice supports font embedding since version 4.1 in its Writer, Calc and Impress applications.

== In word processors ==
Microsoft Word for Windows has permitted font embedding in some document formats since Word 97 (such as .doc or .rtf). But this feature does not work correctly in some Word versions.

LibreOffice supports font embedding since version 4.1. This feature is available for LibreOffice Writer, the spreadsheet application LibreOffice Calc, and the presentation application LibreOffice Impress.

Both OpenOffice.org and LibreOffice support font embedding in the PDF export feature.

Font embedding in word processors is not widely supported nor interoperable. For example, if a .rtf file made in Microsoft Word is opened in LibreOffice Writer, it will usually remove the embedded fonts.

== On the Web ==
Browsers Internet Explorer, Firefox, Safari, Opera and Google Chrome support automatic downloading of fonts used on a website using CSS2 or CSS3.

== Controversy ==
Font embedding is a controversial practice because it allows copyrighted fonts to be freely distributed. The controversy can be mitigated by only embedding the characters required to view the document (subsetting). This reduces file size but prohibits adding previously unused characters to the document.

Because of the potential for copyright infringement, Microsoft Internet Explorer only permits embedded fonts that include digital rights management (DRM) protections. The Acid3 test requires font embedding with minimal DRM protections.

== See also ==
- ODTTF as used in Microsoft's Open XML Paper Specification
