= PDF/X =

File format

PDF/X (Print production eXchange)
- Filename extension: .pdf
- Internet media type: application/pdf
- Type code: 'PDF ' (including a single space)
- Magic number: %PDF-
- Developed by: ISO
- Initial release: 2001
- Extended from: PDF
- Standard: ISO 15930

PDF/X is a subset of the ISO standard for PDF. The purpose of PDF/X is to facilitate graphics exchange, and it therefore has a series of printing-related requirements which do not apply to standard PDF files. For example, in PDF/X-1a all fonts need to be embedded and all images need to be CMYK or spot colors. PDF/X-3 accepts calibrated RGB and CIELAB colors, while retaining most of the other restrictions of PDF/X-1a.

PDF/X files must not only follow certain restrictions, they also must contain a special file identification, inside the PDF, which says which PDF/X version they are. This means that a file can only conform to a single specific PDF/X standard, even if all other requirements of another version are met.

The printing conditions or output intent need to be specified in the file. This can be specified in the form of standard profiles using codes, like "CGATS TR 001 SWOP".

In a PDF/X file that has color-managed data, each color-managed graphic gets its own color profile, so even though the file as a whole is CMYK, individual graphics may be RGB (with calibration information).

Various boxes must be defined: the MediaBox, which defines the size of the entire document, and either the ArtBox or the TrimBox, which defines the extent of the printable area. If the file is to be printed with bleed, a BleedBox, which must be larger than the TrimBox/ArtBox, but smaller than the MediaBox, must be defined.

Active content is not allowed in a PDF/X file. This means that standard PDF features like forms, signatures, comments and embedded sounds and movies are not allowed in PDF/X. Features that are forbidden in the PDF/X standard can sometimes be used, if they do not affect the rendering of the file. This allows for things like annotations outside the BleedBox.

== List of the PDF/X standards ==
PDF/X is formalized in ISO standards 15929 and 15930:

- ISO 15929 (which was withdrawn in March 2008 and no longer is an official standard) specified the guidelines and principles for the development of PDF/X standards.
- ISO 15930 defines the specific implementations:
  - ISO 15930-1:2001: PDF/X-1a:2001, blind exchange in CMYK + spot colors, based on PDF 1.3
  - ISO 15930-2: PDF/X-2, was never published.
  - ISO 15930-3:2002: PDF/X-3:2002, allows CMYK, spot, calibrated (managed) RGB, CIELAB, with ICC Profile, based on PDF 1.3.
  - ISO 15930-4:2003: PDF/X-1a:2003, revision of PDF/X-1a:2001 based on PDF 1.4
  - ISO 15930-5:2003: PDF/X-2, An extension of PDF/X-3 which allows for OPI-like (external linked) data to be included. It was withdrawn in 2011.
  - ISO 15930-6:2003: PDF/X-3:2003, revision of PDF/X-3:2002 based on PDF 1.4
  - ISO 15930-7:2008: PDF/X-4, Colour-managed, CMYK, gray, RGB or spot color data are supported, as are PDF transparency and optional content. A second conformance level named PDF/X-4p may be used when the ICC Profile in the output intent is externally supplied. It is using PDF 1.6. A second edition with minor corrections and improvements (which does not change file identifications) is ISO 15930-7:2010.
  - ISO 15930-8:2008: PDF/X-5, with a second edition with minor corrections and improvements (which does not change file identifications) as ISO 15930-8:2010. It is based on PDF 1.6. A collection of three conformance levels:
    - PDF/X-5g: An extension of PDF/X-4 that enables the use of external graphical content. This can be described as OPI-like (Open Prepress Interface) workflows. Specifically, this allows graphics to be referenced that are outside the PDF, which "can have value in reducing... demands... by allowing... work with low resolution" [ISO-15930-8:2010].
    - PDF/X-5pg: An extension of PDF/X-4p that enables the use of external graphical content in conjunction with a reference to an external ICC Profile for the output intent.
    - PDF/X-5n: An extension of PDF/X-4p that allows the externally supplied ICC Profile for the output intent to use a color space other than Grayscale, RGB and CMYK.
  - ISO 15930-9:2020: PDF/X-6 based on PDF 2.0 (ISO 32000‑2) and was published in November 2020. It defines the extensions PDF/X-6p and PDF/X-6n for partial exchange of printing data with external profile reference.

== Identifications ==
All versions of PDF/X contain file identifications that indicate the version of PDF/X to which they conform. This appears in a document info dictionary, in document metadata, or both, according to the standard used. As of 2010, the complete list of file identifications are the following strings: PDF/X-1:2001, PDF/X-1a:2001, PDF/X-1a:2003, PDF/X-3:2002, PDF/X-3:2003, PDF/X-4, PDF/X-4p, PDF/X-5g, PDF/X-5pg. Observe that this means that the various revisions of PDF/X-1a and PDF/X-3 are distinct types, while the revisions to PDF/X-4 and PDF/X-5 variations are not.

== See also ==
- PDF
- PDF/A
- PDF/E
- PDF/UA
- PDF/VT
