= Proprietary file format =

File format that is not a free and open format

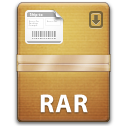
The Unarchiver, an application that supports several proprietary archive formats, uses this icon to represent a proprietary RAR archive.

A proprietary file format is a file format of a company, organization, or individual that contains data that is ordered and stored according to a particular encoding-scheme, such that the decoding and interpretation of this stored data is easily accomplished only with particular software or hardware that the company itself has developed. In contrast, an open or free format is a file format that is published and free to be used by everybody.

Some proprietary format may be documented by the developer and released with a note that the format is subject to change without notice, and that the file should only be read or written with libraries provided by the developer. In other cases, the specification of the data encoding format may not be publicly documented at all; in some cases, the format may only be released to those who have signed non-disclosure agreements. A proprietary format can also be a file format whose encoding is in fact published but is restricted through licenses such that only the company itself or licensees may use it.

Proprietary formats are typically controlled by a company or organization for its own benefit, and the restriction of its use by others is ensured through patents or as trade secrets. It is thus intended to give the license holder exclusive control of the technology to the (current or future) exclusion of others. Typically such restrictions attempt to prevent reverse engineering, though reverse engineering of file formats for the purposes of interoperability is generally regarded as being legal by those who practice it. For example, the US Digital Millenium Copyright Act allows for the reverse-engineering of file formats used for copyright management systems for the purpose of allowing users to exercise their fair use rights to copyrighted media.

As control over a format may be exerted in varying ways and in varying degrees, and documentation of a format may deviate in many different ways from the ideal, there is not necessarily a clear black/white distinction between open and proprietary formats. Nor is there any universally recognized "bright line" separating the two. The lists of prominent formats below illustrate this point, distinguishing "open" (i.e. publicly documented) proprietary formats from "closed" (undocumented) proprietary formats and including a number of cases which are classed by some observers as open and by others as proprietary.

== Privacy, control, risk and freedom ==
One of the contentious issues surrounding the use of proprietary formats is the control of the files. If the information is stored in a way which the user's software provider tries to keep secret, the user may store the information by virtue of having generated it, but they have no way to retrieve it except by using a version of the original software which produced the file. Without a standard file format or reverse engineered converters, users cannot share data with people using competing software. The fact that the user depends on a particular brand of software to retrieve the information stored in a proprietary format file increases barriers of entry for competing software and may contribute to vendor lock-in.

The issue of risk comes about because proprietary formats are less likely to be publicly documented and therefore less future proof. If the software firm controlling that format stops making software which can read it, then those who had used the format in the past may lose all information in those files. This is particularly common with formats that were not widely adopted.

== Prominent proprietary formats ==
=== Open proprietary formats ===
- AAC – an open standard, but controlled by Via Licensing
- GEDCOM – an open specification for genealogy data exchange, controlled by the Church of Jesus Christ of Latter-day Saints

=== Closed proprietary formats ===
- CDR – (non-documented) CorelDraw's native format primarily used for vector graphic drawings
- DWG – (non-documented) AutoCAD drawing
- MAX – (non-documented) 3ds Max
- PSD – (documented) Adobe Photoshop's native image format
- RAR – (partially documented) archive and compression file format controlled by Alexander L. Roshal
- WMA – a closed format, controlled by Microsoft

=== Controversial ===
- RTF – a formatted text format (proprietary, published specification, defined and maintained only by Microsoft)
- SWF – Adobe Flash format (formerly closed/undocumented, now partially or completely open)
- XFA – Adobe XML Forms Architecture, used in PDF files (published specification by Adobe, required but not documented in the PDF ISO 32000-1 standard; controlled and maintained only by Adobe)
- ZIP – a base version of this data compression and archive file format is in the public domain, but newer versions have some patented features

=== Formerly proprietary ===
- GIF – CompuServe's Graphics Interchange Format (the specification's royalty-free licence requires implementers to give CompuServe credit as owner of the format; separately, patents covering certain aspects of the specification were held by Unisys until they expired in 2004)
- MP3 – an open standard which was formerly subject to patents in some countries, the last patent expiring in April 2017.
- PDF – Adobe's Portable Document Format (open since 2008 - ISO 32000-1), but there are still some technologies indispensable for the application of ISO 32000-1 that are defined only by Adobe and remain proprietary (e.g. Adobe XML Forms Architecture, Adobe JavaScript).
- DOC – Microsoft Word Document (formerly closed/undocumented, now Microsoft Open Specification Promise)
- XLS – Microsoft Excel spreadsheet file format (formerly closed/undocumented, now Microsoft Open Specification Promise)
- PPT – Microsoft PowerPoint Presentation file format (formerly closed/undocumented, now Microsoft Open Specification Promise)

== See also ==
- Open file format
- De facto standard
- Dominant design
