= PDF/VT =

File format for printed documents

PDF/Variable and transactional printing
- Filename extension: .pdf
- Internet media type: application/pdf
- Type code: 'PDF ' (including a single space)
- Magic number: %PDF-
- Developed by: ISO
- Extended from: PDF
- Standard: ISO 16612

PDF/VT is an international standard first published by ISO in August 2010 as ISO 16612-2 and later as ISO 16612-3. It defines the use of PDF as an exchange format optimized for variable and transactional printing. Built on top of PDF/X, it is the first variable-data printing (VDP) format which ensures modern International Color Consortium-based (ICC) color management through the use of ICC Output Intents. It adds the notion of encapsulated groups of graphic objects to support optimized efficient processing for repeating text, graphic or image content. PDF/VT first introduced the concept of document part metadata (DPM) which was later adopted into ISO 32000-2 (PDF 2.0). In PDF/VT, DPM enables reliable and dynamic management of pages for High Volume Transactional Output (HVTO) print data, like record selection or postage optimization based on metadata.

ISO 16612-1:2010 defines PDF/VT-1 and PDF/VT-2 and is based on PDF/X-4 (PDF 1.6) and PDF/X-5 (PDF 1.6).

ISO 16612-3:2020 defines PDF/VT-3 and applies to PDF/X-6 files, based on ISO 32000-2 (PDF 2.0).

== Support ==
While PDF/VT are always self-contained files, other variants of the standard support the use of external graphic content (PDF/VT-2) as well as streaming through the use of multi-part MIME packages (PDF/VT-2s). In addition to being a digital master for VDP printing, it can be shared, viewed and interactively navigated by human operators using a normal PDF reader, though completely accurate rendering requires a PDF/X or PDF/VT conforming viewer.

== Products ==
A number of vendors announced their support for PDF/VT upon publication of the standard in 2010. Over the subsequent few years various other PDF/VT-consuming and -producing products also reached the market:

- PDF/VT producer: The vendor PDFlib joined the ranks of producing vendors in April 2011 with PDFlib 8 VT Edition which is able to generate valid PDF/VT data. The vendor PrintSoft (now Objectif Lune) since late 2013 provides PReS 6.3.0 which is able to generate valid PDF/VT data. The vendor XMPie provides since March 2023 desktop or server-based composition engines which are able to generate valid PDF/VT-3 data.
- PDF/VT validator: callassoftware has upgraded its Pre-flight (printing) application "pdfToolbox" version 5 with the option to check for PDF/VT conformity.
- PDF/VT consumers: Adobe have upgraded their Raster image processor software Adobe PDF PrintEngine (APPE) to add support for efficient PDF/VT processing. APPE is embedded and built into many high speed printers made by different vendors. Global Graphics have supported PDF/VT in their Harlequin RIP since v8.2, which was launched at Ipex in April 2010 by Hewlett-Packard in the DFE driving the Indigo Digital Press.

The ubiquity of PDF, as well as the fact that PDF itself now is an ISO standard (ISO 32000-1:2008) clearly work in favor of PDF/VT. Nevertheless, it is currently difficult to predict where in the industry PDF/VT will be adopted and how fast that will happen, and how it will be positioned vis-à-vis other formats and architectures for variable data printing.

The practical requirements and benefits of PDF/VT are explained in more detail, along with related recommendations, in a guide from Global Graphics.

== See also ==
- Advanced Function Presentation
