= PDF/UA =

Standard for accessible PDF technology

PDF/Universal Accessibility
- Filename extension: .pdf
- Internet media type: application/pdf
- Type code: 'PDF ' (including a single space)
- Magic number: %PDF-
- Developed by: ISO
- Initial release: 15 July 2012
- Latest release: Part 2:2024; March 2024; 2 years ago
- Extended from: PDF
- Standard: ISO 14289

PDF/UA (PDF/Universal Accessibility), formally ISO 14289, is an International Organization for Standardization (ISO) standard for accessible PDF technology. A technical specification intended for developers implementing PDF writing and processing software, PDF/UA provides definitive terms and requirements for accessibility in PDF documents and applications. For those equipped with appropriate software, conformance with PDF/UA ensures accessibility for people with disabilities who use assistive technology such as screen readers, screen magnifiers, joysticks and other technologies to navigate and read electronic content.

On February 18, 2015 the US Access Board announced its Proposed Rule for US federal policy on accessibility, commonly known as Section 508. The proposed rule identifies PDF/UA as equivalent to WCAG 2.0 for "appropriate content".

== Description ==
PDF/UA is not a separate file-format but simply a way to use the familiar PDF format invented by Adobe Systems and now standardized as ISO 32000.

In general PDF/UA requires tagged PDF (ISO 32000-1, 14.8), but adds a variety of qualitative requirements, especially regarding semantic correctness of the tags employed:

PDF/UA complements WCAG 2.0, and should be used to make PDF files that also conform with WCAG 2.0.

The 2014 update to PDF/UA, published in December 2014, is the first fully accessible standard ISO has ever published; the PDF file distributed by ISO itself conforms to PDF/UA.

=== Requirements for conforming PDF files (Clause 7) ===
- Complete tagging of "real content" in logical reading order
- Tags must correctly represent the document's semantic structures (headings, lists, tables, etc.)
- Problematic content is prohibited, including illogical headings, the use of color/contrast to convey information, inaccessible JavaScript, and more
- Meaningful graphics must include alternative text descriptions
- Security settings must allow assistive technology access to the content
- Fonts must be embedded, and text mapped to Unicode

=== Requirements for conforming PDF processors (Clause 8) ===
- The ability to fully process tags and artifacts in PDF files
- The ability to announce relevant actions to users
- The ability to process and represent digital signatures, annotations and Optional Content
- The ability to navigate the document by a variety of means

=== Requirements for conforming assistive technology (AT) (Clause 9) ===
- The ability to represent information provided by a PDF/UA conforming reader to the AT user
- The ability to navigate the document by a variety of means

The formal name of PDF/UA is "ISO 14289-1 Document management applications — Electronic document file format enhancement for accessibility — Part 1: Use of ISO 32000-1 (PDF/UA-1)".

== Audience and benefits ==
While the PDF/UA specification is written for software developers, PDF/UA support is of interest to persons with disabilities who require or benefit from assistive technology when reading electronic content. With PDF/UA conforming files, readers and assistive technology, users are guaranteed – so far as the PDF format itself can provide – equal access to information.

With support for PDF/UA, reader software can reflow text onto small screens, provide navigation options, change text appearance, improve search engine functionality and aid in the selection and copying of text.

== History ==
The PDF/UA project began in 2004 as an AIIM Standards Committee. The PDF/UA wiki, operated by AIIM, contains agendas, meeting-minutes and public-access documents pertaining to the development of PDF/UA.

Chaired since 2005 by Duff Johnson, in 2009 AIIM's PDF/UA Committee became the U.S. Committee for ISO/AWI (Accepted Work Item) 14289 with Cherie Ekholm of Microsoft as International Project Leader.

The US Committee continued as the main driver of the standard's development through the WD, CD, DIS and FDIS Phases of ISO standards development, with review, comment and balloting by the member bodies of ISO TC 171.

ISO 14289-1:2012 (PDF/UA) was published in July, 2012. A minor update (ISO 14289-1:2014) was published in December 2014. The document is available directly from the ISO's webstore.

In October 2012 the US Library of Congress added PDF/UA to their list of archivable file formats. The LoC's guidance states that PDF/UA is "...a preferred format for page-oriented content by the Library of Congress."

Adobe Systems, the largest implementer of interactive PDF software, has announced its intention to support PDF/UA.

In December 2014 ISO published ISO 14289-1:2014, a minor revision of the original 2012 document.

In March 2016 AIIM and ANSI published PDF/UA as an American National Standard:.

AIIM's US Committee for PDF/UA has published the following documents in support of PDF/UA:

- Achieving WCAG 2.0 with PDF/UA
- PDF/UA-1 Technical Implementation Guide: Understanding ISO 14289-1 (PDF/UA-1)
- PDF/UA-1 Technical Implementation Guide: Understanding ISO 32000-1 (PDF 1.7)

== Ongoing ISO and AIIM Committee activities ==
Work on ISO 14289-2 (PDF/UA-2) is ongoing. PDF/UA-2 will be based on PDF 2.0.

== Committee organization and leadership ==
AIIM's US Committee for PDF/UA led development of the document from 2004 until 2010, when the draft became an ISO NWI. Both US and ISO Committees maintain their work on AIIM's PDF Standards wiki.

- Project Leader, International Committee: Duff Johnson, Independent Consultant and Executive Director of the PDF Association
- U.S. Chair & Spokesperson: Duff Johnson, Independent Consultant and Executive Director of the PDF Association
- TC 171 SC 2 WG 9 Secretary: Betsy Fanning, Standards Director at 3D PDF Consortium 3D PDF Consortium - The Experts in PDF for Engineering
- Convener, International Committee: Matthew Hardy, Adobe Systems

Participation by subject matter experts, software developers and other interested parties is invited and encouraged.

== PDF Association activities ==
The PDF Association helps promote PDF/UA in a variety of ways.

=== PDF/UA Competence Center ===
In 2011 the PDF Association created the PDF/UA Competence Center as a way for vendors to develop educational resources and share experiences regarding implementation of PDF/UA. The Matterhorn Protocol (see below) is a product of the PDF/UA Competence Center.

=== "NVDA goes PDF/UA" project ===
In 2012 and 2013 the PDF Association helped raise money and awareness for NV Access's NVDA to further development of the world's first PDF/UA conforming screen reader.

=== Matterhorn Protocol ===
In August 2013 the PDF Association's PDF/UA Competence Center published the Matterhorn Protocol, a set of 31 checkpoints and 136 failure conditions to help software developers make it easier for document authors to create fully accessible PDF files and forms.

=== PDF/UA Reference Suite ===
In June 2014 the PDF Association's PDF/UA Competence Center published the first iteration of the PDF/UA Reference Suite, a set of reference-quality documents conforming to PDF/UA-1.

=== "Tagged PDF Best Practice Guide" ===
In December 2015 the PDF Association's PDF/UA Competence Center unveiled the first public draft of its "Tagged PDF Best Practice Guide". Publication is expected by the summer of 2016.

=== Seminars, books and brochures ===
The PDF Association conducted numerous educational seminars on PDF/UA throughout Europe, North America and Australia in 2012 and 2013. A book, "PDF/UA in a Nutshell", was produced in both English and German. An informational brochure was also produced in both languages.
