= PDF Association =

- Abbreviation: PDFa
- Predecessor: PDF/A Competence Center
- Formation: 2006; 20 years ago
- Type: Registered association
- Purpose: Portable Document Format Standardization
- Headquarters: Berlin, Germany
- Region served: International
- Members: >150 members in ~30 countries
- Executive Director: Duff Johnson
- Main organ: Board of Directors
- Website: www.pdfa.org

The PDF Association promotes the adoption and use of international standards related to PDF technology by assisting enterprise content management (ECM), document management system (DMS) and advanced PDF users with the implementation of PDF technology on an organizational level. In order to assist companies in making the most of PDF technology, the PDF Association provides organizations with information and resources on the variety of international standards available for PDF.

== Mission ==
The PDF Association's stated mission is to promote Open Standards-based electronic document implementations using PDF technology through education, expertise and shared experience for stakeholders worldwide.

== Membership ==
PDF Association membership is open to any company or individual wishing to be involved. There are tiered fees depending on the size of the company.

== History ==
Established in 2006 as an initiative of the Association for Digital Document Standards (ADDS), and known then as the PDF/A Competence Center (PDFACC), the organization's primary focus was to promote awareness and standards-compliant implementation of PDF/A technology.

In 2011 the PDFACC expanded its scope to cover all of PDF technology and became the PDF Association. Members hail from over 20 countries around the world. PDF Association chapters can be found in Australia, Benelux, France, Germany, Italy, North America, Scandinavia, Spain, Switzerland, and United Kingdom, among others.

== See also ==
- International Organization for Standardization (ISO)
- American National Standards Institute (ANSI)
