= Kobo Aura =

E-book reader

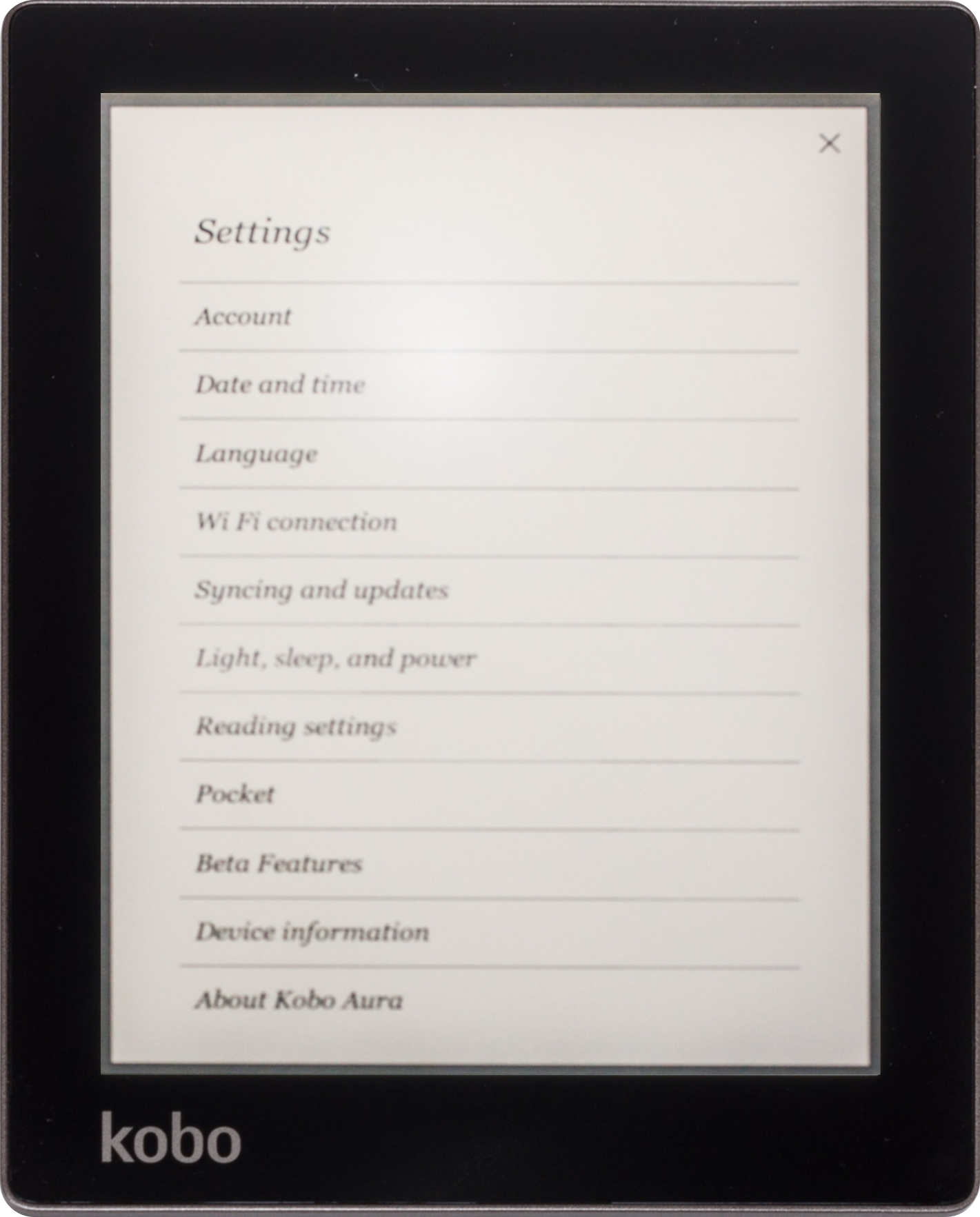
- Kobo Aura displaying its settings menu
- Manufacturer: Kobo Inc.
- Product family: Kobo eReader
- Operating system: Kobo Firmware 4.38.23171 (Released 10/29/24)
- CPU: 1 GHz Freescale i.MX507
- Storage: 4 GB Sandisk embedded flash (SDIN7DP2-4G)
- Removable storage: microSD card slot supporting up to 32GB cards
- Display: 6 in diagonal, 16-level grayscale 1024 × 758 electronic paper
- Input: Capacitive Touchscreen; On-screen keyboard
- Power: 3.7V 1500mAh
- Dimensions: 150 x 114 x 8.1 mm
- Weight: 174 g (6.1 oz)
- Predecessor: Kobo Glo
- Successor: Kobo Aura H2O

The Kobo Aura is the fifth generation of E-book readers designed and marketed by Kobo Inc. It was revealed 27 August 2013 at Kobo's Beyond the Book Event in New York City, along with three new Kobo Arc devices. Available for pre-order the same day, it cost US$149.99/CAD.

== Hardware ==
The Kobo Aura featured several improvements to its immediate predecessor, the Kobo Glo. The screen is now a flat plastic panel, featuring an 'edge to edge' display without a raised border found in predecessors. It uses E Ink's Regal waveform technology along with Pearl HD, eliminating the need for a black refresh screen previously occurring every few pages. The touch screen, now based on capacitive touch, is more responsive than the infrared touch present in its previous products and allows for the use of multitouch. This can be used to control the frontlight built into the device, as well as pinch-to-zoom when reading PDF documents.

The Kobo Aura also featured a redesigned body. Shorter and more square than its competitors, the Kindle Paperwhite and Nook Glowlight, it was designed to be easier to grip. The back is of a similar design to the Kobo Aura HD, with an angular design reminiscent of crumpled pages of a book. The Kobo Aura shipped in 2 colours: black and pink.

Kobo also sold an accessory to the Kobo Aura called the "Sleepcover", a case that would wake the Kobo Aura from sleep when opened and put the Aura to sleep when closed. This case uses magnets, similar to Apple's Smart Cover.

Kobo claims the battery will last for over 2 months with 30 minutes of reading a day, ComfortLight turned on or off, and Wi-Fi turned off.

== Software ==
Kobo Aura runs on the Kobo Firmware, based on the Linux kernel. The software is available in 8 languages and 2 variants: English, French, Canadian French, Japanese, German, Dutch, Italian, Spanish, Portuguese, and Brazilian Portuguese.

The main screen shows tiles that automatically update based on actions the user has performed. Tiles may appear for books, newspapers, magazines, store categories, or games the user has recently read, browsed, or played, respectively. The main screen is called "Reading Life".

The main application, the digital reader, supports a variety of ebook formats: ePub, PDF, Adobe DRM, RTF, HTML, TXT, Comic Book Archive file, JPEG, PNG, BMP, GIF, and TIFF. By flicking or tapping a side of the screen, the user may advance to the next page or previous page. Highlighting, adding notes, and looking up definitions in the built-in dictionaries is also possible by long-tapping a passage in any part of the book. With the introduction of the Kobo Aura, Kobo introduced a new software feature called "Beyond the Book". Similar to Amazon's X-Ray feature, Beyond the Book allows a user to find more information about part of the book, providing similar topics, books, and authors. The Kobo Aura also provides statistics about reading progress: average reading time per session, total time read, pages turned, and the percentage of books completed.

Adding fonts is possible on the Kobo Aura: By creating a directory called "fonts" and putting any OTF or TTF font into this directory, a user can use any font on their Kobo Aura. Adjusting the font is possible with a feature called TypeGenius: users can change the weight, sharpness, and font size of any preinstalled fonts on the Kobo.

Books can be viewed in a list view or grid view in the user's library. They can be arranged based on title, author, file size, file type, and when they were last opened. Users can also arrange their books into collections.

Users may also download books through the use of the Kobo Bookstore. Adding books to a wishlist, purchasing books, and browsing through the library can be done on the Kobo itself thanks to the Wi-Fi chip. Once purchased, books are saved in the cloud and can be redownloaded at any time if the user has deleted the book from his/her device. This feature also allows for reading location, bookmarks, highlights, and notes to be synced across many devices.

eBooks compatible with the Kobo Aura can be borrowed from many public libraries, including the Ottawa Public Library and the Toronto Public Library. These books with DRM require authentication from Adobe in order to be read on the device. Books may be added to the device with the Kobo Desktop app or third party apps such as Calibre.

The Kobo Aura also includes integration with the read-it-later service Pocket. Once a user has signed in with their Pocket account, articles saved to Pocket can be read on the Kobo Aura.

Seven applications are included with the Kobo Aura: a web browser, sudoku, chess (removed from the latest update), Unblock it, Word Scramble, Solitaire, and a sketch pad. The web browser allows for downloading of files that can be read on the device. Kobo does not provide technical support for these applications.

== Reception ==
Reception to the Kobo Aura was mixed to positive. Reviews generally praised the build quality and the hardware of the device itself; they also appreciated an alternative to the Kindle and Nook. It was awarded with the PTPA Seal of Approval.

The complaints included the pricing ($20–$30 more than competitors), the smaller ecosystem, and the lack of audio.
