= Kobo Aura HD =

2013 digital book device from Kobo Inc

- Manufacturer: Kobo Inc.
- Product family: Kobo eReader
- Type: E-book reader
- Operating system: Kobo Firmware 3.12.1
- CPU: 1GHz Freescale i.MX507
- Storage: Internal MicroSD card, 4GB
- Removable storage: MicroSD card slot; up to 32GB
- Display: 6.8 in diagonal, 16-level grayscale 1440 × 1080 electronic paper
- Input: zForce Touchscreen; On-screen keyboard
- Power: 3.7V, 1500mAh
- Dimensions: 175.7 x 128.3 x 11.7 mm
- Weight: 8.5 oz (240 g)

The Kobo Aura HD (also called the Aura HD) is a limited-edition Kobo eReader device designed and marketed by Kobo Inc. It was revealed 15 April 2013 and allowed for preorders the next day at a price of 169.99 USD/CAD. It arrived in stores in Canada and the United Kingdom on 25 April 2013. The marketing slogan of the Kobo Aura HD was "The eReader, reimagined." In October 2014 the Kobo Aura H2O was launched, it has a similar screen resolution to the Kobo Aura HD but has a waterproof coating. Kobo's CEO announced in March 2015 that the Kobo Aura HD was officially discontinued.

== Hardware ==
The hallmark feature of this device was the display – at 6.8 inches (diagonal) it was larger than other popular e-book readers such as the Kobo Glo, Kindle Paperwhite, and Nook Simple Touch with Glowlight with screens of 6 inches. The screen offered by the Aura HD offered 30% more screen area than the 6-inch screens of competitors. It was also of a much higher resolution, with a WXGA+ 1440 × 1080 screen offering 265 ppi; with Pearl E ink technology, the screen allowed for a much improved text rendering. This screen was marketed as the "ClarityScreen+" by Kobo.

The Aura HD shipped in three colours: espresso, ivory, and onyx. It was made of a new material; whereas previous Kobo eReaders used a soft touch matte plastic, the Aura HD's body was made of a harder, shinier, plastic. This was accompanied with an angular back design, resembling crumpled pages of a physical book, used for added grip.

The CPU is 1 GHz Freescale i.MX507. Built-in memory totalled 4 GB, allowing 3,000 books to be stored on the device. This was expandable via microSD card slot; adding up to 32 GB of storage was possible.

The ComfortLight introduced in the Kobo Glo was also present in the Kobo Aura, allowing a user to read in the dark. Battery life was estimated to be up to two months, assuming 30 minutes of reading a day and Wi-Fi turned off.

== Software ==
Kobo Aura HD runs on the Kobo Firmware, based on the Linux kernel. The software is available in eight languages and two variants: English, French, Canadian French, Japanese, German, Dutch, Italian, Spanish, Portuguese, and Brazilian Portuguese. The operating system was redesigned with the launch of the Aura HD, featuring a new library view and a new home screen.

The main application, the digital reader, supports a variety of ebook formats: ePub, PDF, Adobe DRM, RTF, HTML, TXT, Comic Book Archive file, JPEG, PNG, BMP, GIF, and TIFF. By flicking or tapping a side of the screen, the user may advance to the next page or previous page. Finetuning a font in a book is possible with a feature called TypeGenius: users can change the weight, sharpness, and font size of any preinstalled fonts on the Kobo. Highlighting, adding notes, and looking up definitions in the built-in dictionaries is also possible by long-tapping a passage in any part of the book. The Kobo Aura HD also provides statistics about reading progress: average reading time per session, total time read, pages turned, and the percentage of books completed.

Users may also download books through the use of the Kobo Bookstore. Adding books to a wishlist, purchasing books, and browsing through the library can be done on the Kobo itself thanks to the Wi-Fi chip. Once purchased, books are saved in the cloud and can be redownloaded at any time if the user has deleted the book from his/her device. This feature also allows for reading location, bookmarks, highlights, and notes to be synced across many devices.

== Reception ==
The reception of the Kobo Aura HD was generally positive. Reviewers appreciated the larger screen, the increased pixel density, the ComfortLight, and the abundant storage options. The pricing was the universal gripe: although many felt that the eReader was worth it, they noted that it cost $30 more than the closest competitors. In 2013 it contributed 25% of all of Kobo's hardware sales.
