= Kobo Mini =

2012 Kobo eReader with 5" screen

- Manufacturer: Kobo Inc.
- Type: E-book reader
- Released: 6 September 2012
- Introductory price: USD/CAD $79
- Operating system: Kobo Firmware 3.4.1
- CPU: ARM Cortex A8 800 MHz single-core Freescale MCIMX507CVM8B
- Memory: 256MB Samsung DDR SDRAM
- Storage: 2 GB internal memory Internal microSD card slot
- Display: 5 inches (127 mm) diagonal, 16-level grayscale 600 × 800 electronic paper
- Input: zForce Touchscreen; On-screen keyboard
- Connectivity: CyberTAN WC121 802.11b/g/n SDIO Module
- Power: 3.7V 1000mAh 3.7 Wh
- Dimensions: 102 X 133 x 10mm
- Weight: 4.7 oz (134 g)

The Kobo Mini is a miniature, touch-based e-book reader produced by Kobo Inc.

== Hardware ==
Kobo Mini was introduced on 6 September 2012, with the Kobo Glo and Kobo Arc. Marketed with the slogan "Small is a Big Deal", it was targeted to those who wanted a pocket-sized device.

Kobo Mini includes an E Ink screen for legibility in direct sunlight. It also included a 2 GB internal microsd card (although some units were shipped with 4 GB cards internally, which may be modified by the user, any damage not covered by warranty, to gain access to the unpartitioned space). A distinguishing feature included SnapBacks (removable back covers) available in three colors at launch (Teal, Ruby Red, and Purple) with the distinct Kobo quilt pattern. Kobo Mini was available in two colours: black, and white.

The Kobo Mini was intended to compete with the basic Kindle and Nook Simple Touch, with a similar price, identical screen resolution, and the same amount of storage. Advantages included the smaller dimensions and lighter weight.

Kobo claims the battery lasts for a month, assuming 30 minutes of reading a day and Wi-Fi turned off. Charging the Kobo, as well as transferring documents, is accomplished with the micro-USB connecting port.

== Software ==
Kobo Mini runs on the Kobo Firmware, based on the Linux kernel. The software is available in 8 languages and 2 variants: English, French, Canadian French, Japanese, German, Dutch, Italian, Spanish, Portuguese, and Brazilian Portuguese.

The main screen shows tiles that automatically update based on actions the user has performed. Tiles may appear for books, newspapers, magazines, store categories, or games the user has recently read, browsed, or played, respectively. The main screen is called "Reading Life".

The main application used by the Kobo Mini is the digital reader for books, newspaper, magazines and any document in the ePub, Kobo ePub, HTML, CBZ, CBA, MOBI, or PDF file formats. The reader may adjust the font size, weight, and sharpness with an included tool called TypeGenius to further enhance readability. Highlighting, adding notes, and looking up definitions by long tapping a word or section in a book is also possible.

== Pricing ==
Kobo Mini was initially released at the price of $79.99 in North America, but a $30 discount was offered during the Black Friday season of 2012. Later promotions offered a free Kobo Mini when purchasing a Kobo Arc tablet. By May 2014, the price had dropped to $49.99.

== Reception ==
Kobo Mini was received with positive to mixed reactions. While reviewers praised the compact design of the device, there were several complaints: a less responsive touchscreen, a lack of a target audience, the small screen, and its pricing. Many stated that it would be "great for kids" and "those looking for a less expensive alternative to the Kindle."

== See also ==
- Kobo eReader
- Comparison of e-book readers
