= Barnes & Noble Nook 1st Edition =

First generation Nook e-reader developed by Barnes & Noble

Nook 1st Edition

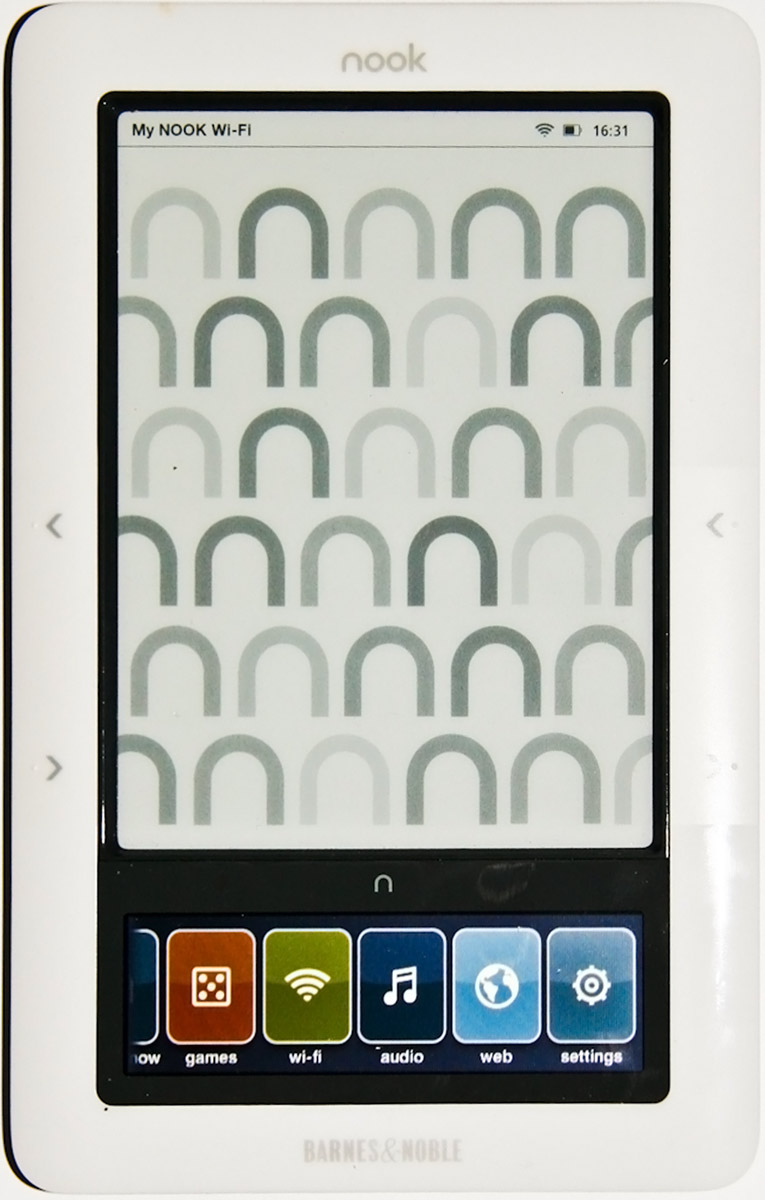
- Developer: Barnes & Noble
- Manufacturer: Foxconn
- Type: E-reader
- Released: November 30, 2009, 3G+Wi-Fi; June 21, 2010, Wi-Fi only
- Introductory price: US$259, 3G+Wi-Fi; US$149, Wi-Fi only
- Operating system: Android 1.5 Cupcake, released November 22, 2010
- CPU: 667 MHz ARMv6-based Samsung S3C6410
- Storage: 2 GB internal MicroSD expands to 32 GB
- Display: 600 × 800 pixel, 6 inch E Ink (167 PPI) and 3.5 inch 480 x 144 pixel color control
- Input: Color touchscreen, left/right paging buttons
- Connectivity: AT&T 3G; 802.11b/g Wi-Fi
- Power: 1530 mAh lithium-ion polymer battery, rechargeable replaceable
- Dimensions: 7.7 in (196 mm) H 4.9 in (124 mm) W 0.5 in (12.7 mm) D
- Weight: 12.1 oz (343 g), 3G + Wi-Fi; 11.6 oz (329 g), Wi-Fi only
- Website: nook.com

The Nook 1st Edition (styled "nook") is the first generation of the Nook e-book reader developed by American book retailer Barnes & Noble, based on the Android platform. The device was announced in the United States in October 2009 and was released the next month. The Nook includes Wi-Fi and AT&T 3G wireless connectivity, a six-inch E Ink display, and a separate, smaller color touchscreen that serves as the primary input device. In June 2010 Barnes & Noble announced a Wi-Fi-only model of the Nook. On June 5, 2018 Barnes & Noble announced support for logging in to BN.com and adding new content to the device will end on June 29, 2018. The second-generation Nook, the Nook Simple Touch, was announced on May 25, 2011 with a June 10 release date.

== History ==
=== 3G + Wi-Fi version ===
This version made its debut on November 22, 2009, at a retail price of $259 and comes with built-in 3G + Wi-Fi connectivity for free access to the Barnes & Noble online store. The price was reduced to $199 on June 21, 2010, upon the release of the new Nook Wi-Fi. The final price drop was made on May 25, 2011, to a closeout price of $169 at the same time of the announcement of the new Nook, named the Nook Simple Touch.

=== Wi-Fi version ===
This version made its debut on June 21, 2010, at a retail price of $149. It is a version of the Nook 1st Edition that supports Wi-Fi only and not 3G Wireless, and it was launched with firmware version 1.4 preinstalled. It is physically easily distinguishable from the 3G + Wi-fi gray-backed version, due to its white back color. A price reduction was made on May 25, 2011, dropping to a closeout price of $119 in accord with the announcement of the new Nook, named the Nook Simple Touch Reader.

== Features ==
The original Nook provides a black-and-white electronic ink (e ink) display for viewing digital content with most navigation and additional content provided through a color touchscreen. Pages are turned using arrow buttons on each side of the Nook or by making swipe gesture on touch screen. The original Nook connects to Barnes & Noble's digital store through a free connection to AT&T's 3G network or through available Wi-Fi connections. Users can read books without a wireless connection; disconnecting the wireless connection can extend the battery's charge to up to ten days.

The device has a MicroSD expansion slot for extra storage and a user-replaceable rechargeable battery. The battery can be charged through either an AC adapter or a micro-USB 2.0 cable, both included with new Nooks. The device also includes a web browser, a built-in dictionary, Chess and Sudoku, an audio player, speakers, and a 3.5 mm headphone jack.

Supported ebook file-formats with DRM include:

- eReader PDB with Barnes & Noble's eReader DRM, sometimes called Secure eReader format (original Nook only)
- EPUB with Barnes & Noble's eReader DRM, used for ebooks downloaded wirelessly to the Nook
- EPUB with Adobe ADEPT DRM, sometimes called Adobe EPUB or Adobe Digital Editions format
- PDF with Adobe ADEPT DRM (however, figures and equations will not appear)

The EPUB with eReader DRM combination is a new format created for the Nook. Adobe has undertaken to include support for that combination in future releases of Adobe Acrobat mobile software, to allow other reader devices to support that format.

Supported ebook file formats without DRM include:

- EPUB
- eReader PDB (original Nook only)
- PDF, including password-protected PDF but not Vitrium-protected PDF

Supported sound file formats for music and audiobooks include MP3 and Ogg Vorbis, but not WMA. Only the original Nook and the Nook Color support sound files.

Nook supports image file formats JPG, GIF, PNG, and BMP, used for book cover thumbnails, wallpapers, and screen savers.

The Nook provides a "LendMe" feature allowing users to share some books with other people, depending on licensing by the book's publisher. The buyer is permitted to share a book once with one other user for up to two weeks. Users will be able to share purchased books with others who are using Barnes & Noble's reader application software for Android, BlackBerry, iPad, iPhone, iPod Touch, Mac OS X, and Windows and others.

The Nook system recognizes physical Barnes & Noble stores. Customers using the Nook in Barnes & Noble stores receive access to special content and offers while the device is connected to the store's Wi-Fi. Further, most e-Books in the catalog can be read for up to an hour while connected to the store Wi-Fi network with the 1.3 software update.

Because Barnes & Noble does not make the Nook available outside the United States, if it is taken overseas it will neither be possible to access a 3G connection nor capable of buying books on the Barnes & Noble Nook Book Store. The Nook is still capable of accessing the same Book Store through Wi-Fi and downloading free books from it outside of the U.S.

== Software versions ==
Barnes & Noble distributes software updates automatically "over the air" or through a manual download.

Version 1.0

- Launch version on the Nook and made its debut on November 22, 2009.

Version 1.1

- Released in December 2009, consists mostly of minor bug fixes.

Version 1.2

- Released in February 2010, improved the device's responsiveness, bookmarking, in-store connectivity, and battery optimization. The update also included interface changes intended to improve navigation of daily subscriptions, clarify LendMe features, and allow sorting of personal files on the device.

Version 1.3

- Released in April 2010, added a web browser (in beta), the games Chess and Sudoku, and more options for Wi-Fi connectivity. Other new features included the ability to read complete ebooks for free in Barnes & Noble stores for an hour at a time, the option to pre-order ebooks that are yet unreleased, minor modifications to the user interface, and improved performance when opening ebooks and turning pages.

Version 1.4

- Released on June 21, 2010, added extended AT&T Wi-Fi Hotspot support, a new extra-extra-large font size, and a Go-to-Page feature.

Version 1.5

- Released on November 22, 2010 and added optional password protection for the device and for making purchases, a "My Shelves" feature for organizing the user's e-book library, and automatic syncing of the last page read across multiple devices. Other improvements include faster page turning and improved search options.

Version 1.6

- Released on June 6, 2011 and included "minor system updates".

Version 1.7

- Released on June 20, 2011 and included "minor system updates".

== Nook apps ==
Free Nook eReader applications are available to allow reading of eBooks purchases to be read on the iPhone, iPad, Android, and Blackberry devices, without the need for a Nook eReader. Originally, there were also desktop versions for Mac and PC; these were quietly withdrawn in mid-2013. Users were pointed to a web-based version instead. A virtual bookmark can be synced across the devices a reader uses.

== Hacking ==
Some Nook users have loaded Android applications on the Nook, such as Pandora, a web browser, a Twitter client called Tweet, Google Reader and a Facebook application. Many general Android applications running on the Nook present interactive areas of their interface on the E Ink display, making such applications difficult to manipulate on the device. However, Android applications optimized for the Nook screen are also available, including app launchers, browsers, library managers, and an online book catalog browser and feed reader.

Although gaining superuser (root) access to install software on the Nook initially required physical disassembly of the device, as of 2010 users can gain root access using software alone.

A new hardware revision introduced in August 2010, identifiable by a serial number starting with 1003, running firmware 1.4.1, requires different software than the older models. Attempting to gain root access using software designed for older models renders the unit unusable.

As of October 2010, a new method involving spoofing a DNS entry has been found to root 1.4.1 Nooks.

== Availability ==
Barnes & Noble made the Nook available for pre-order in the United States for US$259 following its launch on October 20, 2009 and began shipping on November 30, 2009. The device was available for demonstration and display in Barnes & Noble retail stores in early December. Barnes & Noble began selling the Nook in-store in February 2010.

Due to the large number of pre-orders, the initial launch of the product involved multiple shipment dates depending on when customers ordered the Nook. The first shipment occurred as planned on November 30, but delays occurred with subsequent shipments as demand for the product exceeded production. Further shipments occurred between December and February.

Barnes & Noble sent a $100 gift certificate via email to customers who had been promised delivery by December 24, 2009, but whose shipment was delayed past December 25.

== Reception ==
The Nook initially received mixed reviews, ranging from favorable reviews from Time, Money, and PC Magazine to more critical reviews in Engadget and The New York Times. PC Magazine noted the color touchscreen, Wi-Fi and 3G connectivity, and large ebook library as advantages over the Nook's competitors, with a lack of support for HTML and Microsoft's .doc file format seen as negatives. Money compared the Nook favorably to the Amazon Kindle and the Sony Reader Touch Edition. ZDNet blogger Matthew Miller called the Nook "the king of connectivity and content" and wrote favorably about the lending feature and support for PDF and ePub files. Time listed the Nook as one of its "Top 10 Gadgets of 2009".

Critics pointed to the Nook's "sluggish" performance and user interface design, with The New York Times reviewer David Pogue writing that the Nook suffered from "half-baked software." Pogue later demonstrated using a postal scale that the Nook's weight differed from the product specifications advertised by Barnes & Noble (12.1 ounces rather than 11.2 ounces as the company had advertised). Engadget reviewer Joshua Topolsky argued that menu responsiveness and organization was not optimal but commented that "many of the problems seem like they could be fixed with firmware tweaks." PC Magazine wrote that the 1.3 firmware update, released after most reviews of the Nook, improved the device's responsiveness: "On the original Nook, page turning took twice as long as page turning on the Kindle – two seconds compared to one second. With the 1.3 firmware update, it's about a tenth of a second slower than the Kindle, but the difference is negligible."

In early January 2010, the Nook was presented with the TechCrunch Best New Gadget Crunchie award for 2009.

== See also ==
- List of Android devices
- Comparison of e-book readers
- Amazon Kindle
- Nook Simple Touch
- Nook Color
