= Sūgaku Golden =

Japanese manga series

- First tankōbon volume cover

数学ゴールデン (Sūgaku Gōruden)
- Manga
- Written by: Tatsuhiko Kuramaru
- Published by: Hakusensha
- Imprint: Young Animal Comics
- Magazine: Young Animal Zero
- Original run: September 9, 2019 – present
- Volumes: 9

Sūgaku Golden (数学ゴールデン, Sūgaku Gōruden; lit. ''Mathematics Golden'') is a Japanese manga series written and illustrated by Tatsuhiko Kuramaru. It began serialization in Hakusensha's seinen manga magazine Young Animal Zero in September 2019.

== Plot ==
Haruichi Onoda has one goal in his life, representing Japan at the International Mathematical Olympiad. He has become so focused on his goal that he isolated himself from the outside world to avoid distractions. After entering high school, he gets approached by Nanase, a student who also likes mathematics. The two become friends over their shared desire to compete at the olympiad.

== Publication ==
Written and illustrated by Tatsuhiko Kuramaru, Sūgaku Golden began serialization in Hakusensha's seinen manga magazine Young Animal Zero on September 9, 2019. Its chapters have been compiled into nine tankōbon volumes as of August 2026.

No.	Release date	ISBN
1	June 26, 2020	978-4-592-16491-3
2	February 26, 2021	978-4-592-16492-0
3	September 29, 2021	978-4-592-16493-7
4	August 29, 2022	978-4-592-16494-4
5	April 28, 2023	978-4-592-16495-1
6	June 28, 2024	978-4-592-16496-8
7	December 26, 2024	978-4-592-16497-5
8	December 25, 2025	978-4-592-16498-2
9	August 28, 2026	978-4-592-16712-9

== Reception ==
The series was nominated for the seventh Next Manga Awards in 2021 in the print category. The series was ranked second in the "I Want to Deliver It to the World" category at the first Rakuten Kobo E-book Awards in 2023.
