= Hokuō Futari-gurashi =

Japanese manga series by Datarō

- First tankōbon volume cover featuring Fuyumi (left) and Taoka (center)

北欧ふたりぐらし
- Genre: Slice of life
- Manga
- Written by: Datarō
- Published by: Hakusensha
- Imprint: Young Animal Comics
- Magazine: Young Animal Zero
- Original run: November 9, 2021 – November 8, 2025
- Volumes: 5

Hokuō Futari-gurashi (北欧ふたりぐらし, lit. "Nordic Life for Two") is a Japanese manga series written and illustrated by Datarō. It was serialized in Hakusensha's seinen manga magazine Young Animal Zero from November 2021 to November 2025, with its chapters collected in five tankōbon volumes.

== Synopsis ==
The series is centered around a couple moving from Japan to Sweden for a new life. Fuyumi and Taoka have been dating only recently, and after a day where they were both tired after work, Fuyumi sees an ad about Sweden and remarks "I want to go there", then Taoka suggests to her if they should move there and get married and Fuyumi agrees.

== Publication ==
Written and illustrated by Datarō, Hokuō Futari-gurashi was serialized in Hakusensha's seinen manga magazine Young Animal Zero from November 9, 2021, to November 8, 2025. Its chapters were compiled into five tankōbon volumes released from October 28, 2022, to December 25, 2025.

No.	Release date	ISBN
1	October 28, 2022	978-4-592-16061-8
2	July 28, 2023	978-4-592-16062-5
3	May 29, 2024	978-4-592-16063-2
4	March 28, 2025	978-4-592-16064-9
5	December 25, 2025	978-4-592-16065-6

== Reception ==
The series won the grand prize in the "I Want to Deliver It to the World!" category at the 2nd Rakuten Kobo E-book Manga Awards.
