= Kobo Touch =

Third-generation Kobo e-reader device

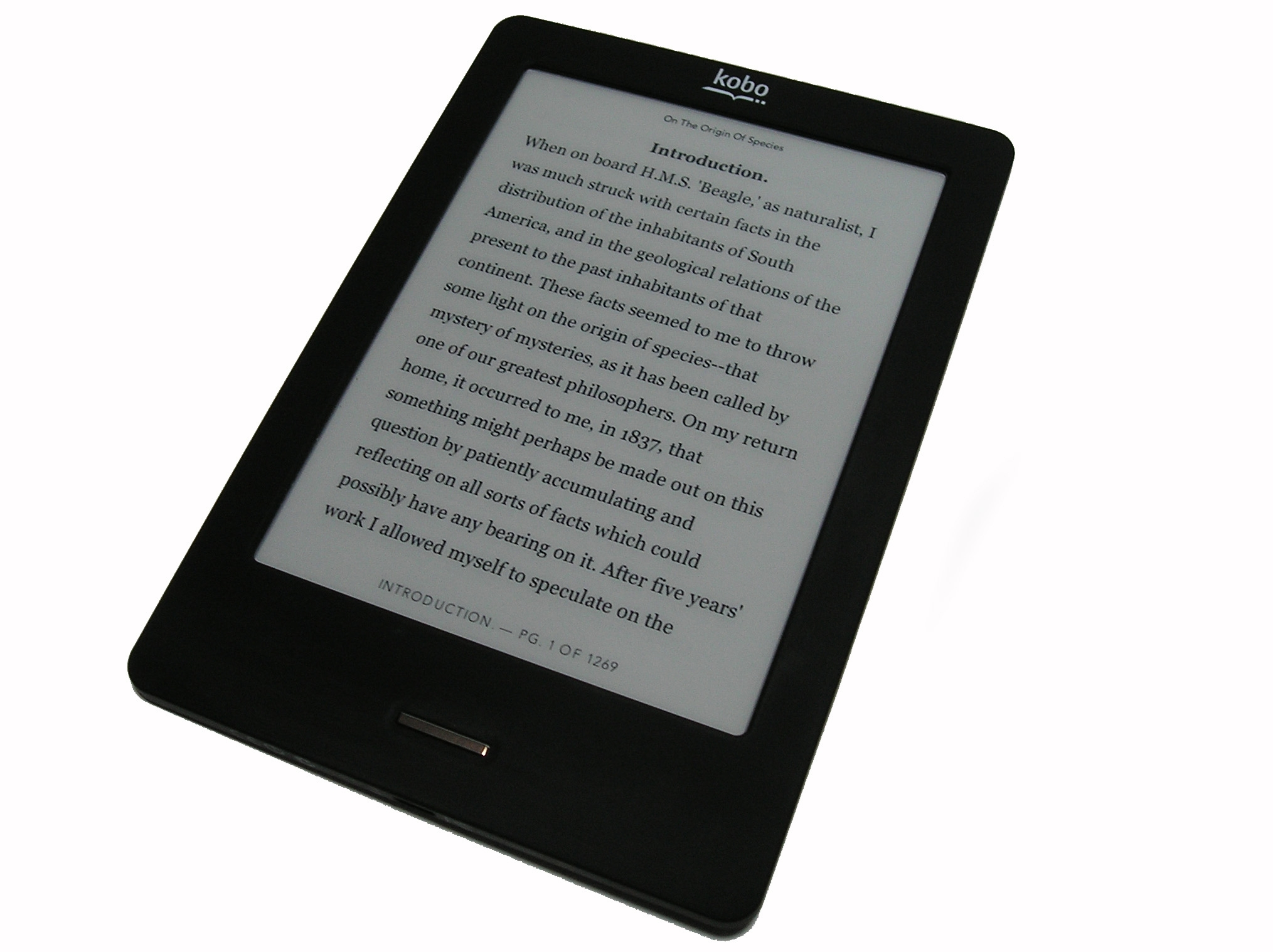
- Manufacturer: Rakuten Kobo Inc.
- Type: E-book reader
- Released: 23 May 2011
- Introductory price: USD $129
- Operating system: Kobo Touch Firmware 3.19
- CPU: Freescale i.MX508
- Storage: 2GB
- Display: 6 in diagonal, 16-level grayscale 800 × 600 electronic paper
- Input: USB 2.0 port (micro-USB connector), SD card
- Connectivity: Wi-Fi (802.11 b/g/n)
- Dimensions: 165 X 114 x 10mm (6.5 X 4.5 x 0.4 in.)
- Weight: 6.5 oz (185 g)
- Best-selling game: Sudoku
- Predecessor: Kobo Wi-Fi
- Successor: Kobo Glo
- Website: Kobo eReader Touch

The Kobo Touch (also called the "Kobo Touch eReader") is the third generation of the Kobo e-reader device designed by Kobo Inc. It was revealed on 23 May 2011 and was released in the U.S. on 10 June 2011 at a price of $129.99.

The Kobo Touch 2.0, the successor to the Touch, was released in September 2015.

== Hardware ==
This model of the Kobo Touch improved upon its predecessors by using a zForce touch-sensitive display; hence its name, the Kobo Touch. The infrared based touch interface does not require electrical conductivity, allowing for the user to interact with the device when wearing gloves. Other improvements included an E Ink Pearl screen, a faster processor capable of smooth PDF panning, 802.11n Wi-Fi capability, and reduced size and weight.

The Kobo Touch is shipped in five colours: lilac, blue, silver, black, and white. It is made of a soft matte plastic. The back of every Kobo device features a quilted pattern. Like the original Kobo model, the Touch is manufactured in Taiwan.

The Kobo Touch was introduced to compete with Amazon's Kindle and Barnes & Noble's Nook. By not including a physical keyboard like the Kindle Keyboard, and leaving only a home button on the front face of the device, Kobo was able to further shrink down the dimensions of the Touch. The 2 GB of memory was similar to what competitors offered; this memory allows for the storage of approximately 1,000 books. With a 32 GB microSD card that can be inserted in the side of the Kobo Touch, the number of books that can be stored rises to 30,000.

Battery life of the Kobo Touch is estimated to be approximately one month, assuming reading for 30 minutes a day and Wi-Fi turned off.

=== Variants ===
Three variants of the Kobo Touch were released: N905, N905B, and N905C. The first was the original Kobo Touch; the second was the model with advertisements; the third was the low-cost model introduced after the release of the Kobo Glo.

== Software ==
Kobo Touch runs on the Kobo Touch Firmware, based on the Linux kernel. The software is available in 8 languages and 2 variants: English, French, Canadian French, Japanese, German, Dutch, Italian, Spanish, Portuguese, and Brazilian Portuguese.

The main screen shows tiles that automatically update based on actions the user has performed. Tiles may appear for books, newspapers, magazines, store categories, or games the user has recently read, browsed, or played, respectively. The main screen is called "Reading Life".

The main application, the digital reader, supports a variety of ebook formats: ePub, PDF, Adobe DRM, MOBI, RTF, HTML, TXT, Comic Book Archive file, JPEG, PNG, BMP, GIF, TIFF. By flicking or tapping a side of the screen, the user may advance to the next page or previous page. Adjusting the font is possible with a feature called TypeGenius: users can change the weight, sharpness, and font size of any preinstalled fonts on the Kobo. Highlighting, adding notes, and looking up definitions in the built-in dictionaries is also possible by long-tapping a passage in any part of the book. The Kobo Touch also provides statistics about reading progress: average reading time per session, total time read, pages turned, and the percentage of books completed.

Books can be viewed in a list view or grid view in the user's library. They can be arranged based on title, author, file size, file type, and when they were last opened. Users can also arrange their books into collections.

Users may also download books through the use of the Kobo Bookstore. Adding books to a wishlist, purchasing books, and browsing through the library can be done on the Kobo itself thanks to the Wi-Fi chip. Once purchased, books are saved in the cloud and can be redownloaded at any time if the user has deleted the book from his/her device. This feature also allows for reading location, bookmarks, highlights, and notes to be synced across many devices.

eBooks compatible with the Kobo Touch can be borrowed from many public libraries, including the Ottawa Public Library and the Toronto Public Library. These books with DRM require authentication from Adobe in order to be read on the device. Books may be added to the device with the Kobo Desktop app or third party apps such as Calibre.

The Kobo Touch also includes integration with the read-it-later service Pocket. Once a user has signed in with their Pocket account, articles saved to Pocket can be read on the Kobo Touch.

Four applications are included with the Kobo Touch: a web browser, sudoku, chess - now replaced by Unblock It - and a sketch pad. The web browser allows for downloading of files that can be read on the device. Kobo does not provide technical support for these applications.

Originally, 15 free previews of select books were included, although Kobo ceased including books with their devices.

== Reception ==
The initial reaction to the Kobo Touch was mixed to positive. Reviewers lauded the design of the device, and the software, most notably praising the inclusion of a touch screen, a new E-ink panel, a microSD card slot, included applications, and the minimalism of the device. Complaints included an overall sluggishness to the interface (which eventually got solved in firmware updates) and the lack of hardware buttons for turning pages.

A rocky launch in Japan led to parent company Rakuten disabling online store product reviews for the first time in their history. Accompanying advertising for the e-book store listed a larger library then was available at the time, prompting action from the Consumer Affairs Agency.

== See also ==
- Comparison of e-book readers
