= Samsung Papyrus =

E-reader device by Samsung

- Manufacturer: Samsung
- Type: E-reader
- Released: June 2009
- Operating system: Linux-2.6.10
- CPU: Freescale 532 MHz, ARM-11
- Storage: (total/user available) 512 MB
- Display: 6-8 in diagonal,
- Power: model

The Samsung Papyrus is an e-reader released by Samsung in June 2009 in South Korea. The device was released in several colors and came with 512 MB internal memory.

It had a touchscreen display and shipped with an aluminum stylus and utility applications such as a calculator, scheduler, and contacts. The device did not come with wireless capabilities so it had to be connected to a computer to transfer e-books on the device.
