= FLEPia =

E-reader device

The Fujitsu FLEPia is a discontinued e-reader capable of displaying up to 260,000 colors. Released in Japan in 2009.
