= Priberam =

Portuguese dictionary software developer

- Company type: Private
- Industry: Software
- Founded: 1989 in Lisbon, Portugal
- Founders: João Prieto, João Bernardo, Carlos Amaral
- Headquarters: Lisbon, Portugal
- Products: Dictionaries, Spell checkers, Grammar checkers, Search engines, Software
- Number of employees: approximately 20
- Website: priberam.com

Priberam is a Portuguese technology company, dictionary editor and software developer, based in Lisbon.

Priberam owns the Dicionário Priberam da Língua Portuguesa ("Priberam Portuguese Language Dictionary"), which is an online dictionary, both for European Portuguese and for Brazilian Portuguese, licensed by Amazon for use with its Kindle devices and for Alexa, and by Kobo.

== History ==
Priberam was founded in 1989 by João Prieto, João Bernardo and Carlos Amaral, as a spin-off of the Instituto Superior Técnico. João Bernardo left shortly after the company was started. Afonso Mendes and Pedro Amaral joined the company shortly thereafter, and are currently, together with Carlos Amaral and João Prieto, the partners of the company.

Priberam was the first company to have an online Portuguese language dictionary, which dates back to 1996.

The company developed the first spell checker for European Portuguese (in 1994), and the first grammar checker for European Portuguese (in 1997).

The company is currently integrating projects in the areas of natural language processing and machine learning.
