= Kobo Glo =

Fourth generation Kobo e-reader

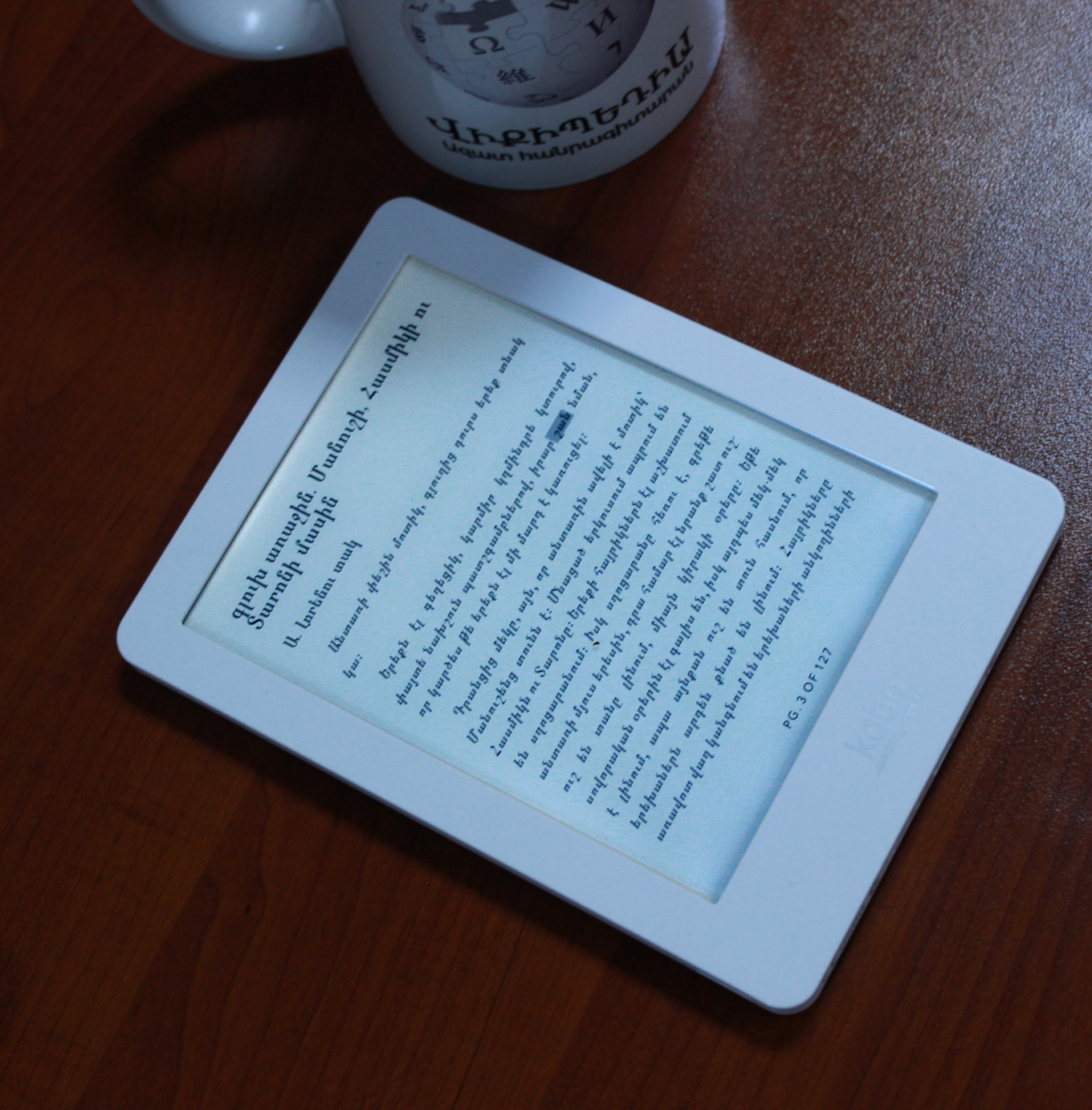
- Manufacturer: Kobo Inc.
- Product family: Kobo eReader
- Type: E-book reader
- Operating system: Kobo Firmware 4.38.23555 (11/27/2025)
- CPU: 1 GHz
- Storage: 2 GB microSD card
- Removable storage: microSD card slot
- Display: 6 in diagonal, 16-level grayscale 1024 × 768 electronic paper
- Input: zForce Touchscreen; On-screen keyboard
- Power: 3.7V 1200mAh
- Dimensions: 114 x 157 x 10 mm
- Weight: 6.5 oz (185 g)
- Predecessor: Kobo Touch
- Successor: Kobo Aura

The Kobo Glo is the fourth generation of Kobo eReader devices designed and marketed by Kobo Inc. It was revealed on 6 September 2012 and arrived at retail 14 October 2012 with a price of $129.99 USD/CAD. It is the successor to the Kobo Touch and was introduced alongside the Kobo Mini and Kobo Arc. The Glo was succeeded in 2015 by the higher-resolution Glo HD, with 4GB built-in storage but no microSD removable storage.

== Hardware ==
The distinguishing feature of this device is the frontlighting technology, allowing a user to read in the dark ("Glo" referring to "Glow" as in "Glow in the dark"). By lighting from the front, the light is less intrusive than an LCD. This light is called the ComfortLight. This light is controlled with a button (to turn it on) and the software (to adjust brightness). According to Kobo, having a uniform distribution of the light across the screen was accomplished with a nano-printed fibre-optic film.

Other improvements to the hardware include a faster processor for snappier performance, a much higher resolution screen, a larger battery, and the removal of the home button.

The Kobo Glo shipped in 4 colours: Black Night, Pink Sunset, Blue Moon, and Silver Star. The back no longer features the quilt pattern found in most of the company's products since its inception; it now has a diamond criss-cross pattern. It is made of the same soft matte plastic used in the Kobo Touch and Kobo Mini.

Kobo advertises a month of reading with light and Wi-Fi off, assuming 30 minutes of reading per day. It also claims up to 70 hours of continuous reading with the light on.

== Software ==
Kobo Glo runs on the Kobo Firmware, based on the Linux kernel. The software is available in 8 languages and 2 variants: English, French, Canadian French, Japanese, German, Dutch, Italian, Spanish, Portuguese, and Brazilian Portuguese.

The main screen shows tiles that automatically update based on actions the user has performed. Tiles may appear for books, newspapers, magazines, store categories, or user has recently read, browsed, or played, respectively. The main screen is called "Reading Life". This software feature originated on the Kobo Aura HD and was brought to the Kobo Glo with a software update.

The main application, the digital reader, supports a variety of ebook formats: ePub, PDF, Adobe DRM, RTF, HTML, TXT, Comic Book Archive file, JPEG, PNG, BMP, GIF, and TIFF. By flicking or tapping a side of the screen, the user may advance to the next page or previous page. Adjusting the font is possible with a feature called TypeGenius: users can change the weight, sharpness, and font size of any preinstalled fonts on the Kobo. Highlighting, adding notes, and looking up definitions in the built-in dictionaries is also possible by long-tapping a passage in any part of the book. The Kobo Glo also provides statistics about reading progress: average reading time per session, total time read, pages turned, and the percentage of books completed.

Books can be viewed in a list view or grid view in the user's library. They can be arranged based on title, author, file size, file type, and when they were last opened. Users can also arrange their books into collections.

Users may also download books through the use of the Kobo Bookstore. Adding books to a wishlist, purchasing books, and browsing through the library can be done on the Kobo itself thanks to the Wi-Fi chip. Once purchased, books are saved in the cloud and can be redownloaded at any time if the user has deleted the book from his/her device. This feature also allows for reading location, bookmarks, highlights, and notes to be synced across many devices.

eBooks compatible with the Kobo Glo can be borrowed from many public libraries, including the Ottawa Public Library and the Toronto Public Library. These books with DRM require authentication from Adobe in order to be read on the device. Books may be added to the device with the Kobo Desktop app or third party apps such as Calibre.

The Kobo Glo also includes integration with the read-it-later service Pocket. Once a user has signed in with their Pocket account, articles saved to Pocket can be read on the Kobo Glo.

Six applications are included with the Kobo Glo: a web browser, sudoku, chess, Unblock it, Word Scramble, and a sketch pad. The web browser allows for downloading of files that can be read on the device. Kobo does not provide technical support for these applications.

== Reception ==
Reception to the Kobo Glo was generally positive.

Engadget praised Kobo for "hitting front-lighting out of the park on their first try", without the "splotchiness" and "uneven lighting" present in the Nook Simple Touch with Glowlight and the Kindle Paperwhite. Wired also commented on the lighting, stating that Kobo had "nearly managed to eliminate the lighting inconsistencies that plague the other two devices". CNET appreciated the inclusion of a microSD card slot and the compatibility with the ePub standard.

Main complaints included the "dated" UI, the lack of an ecosystem, and the pricing of the device. Pocket-lint stated that there was "nothing intrinsically wrong with the Kobo Glo... [but] it's only slightly cheaper [than its competitors], so what's the point?"
