= Michael Serbinis =

Canadian entrepreneur, engineer and angel investor

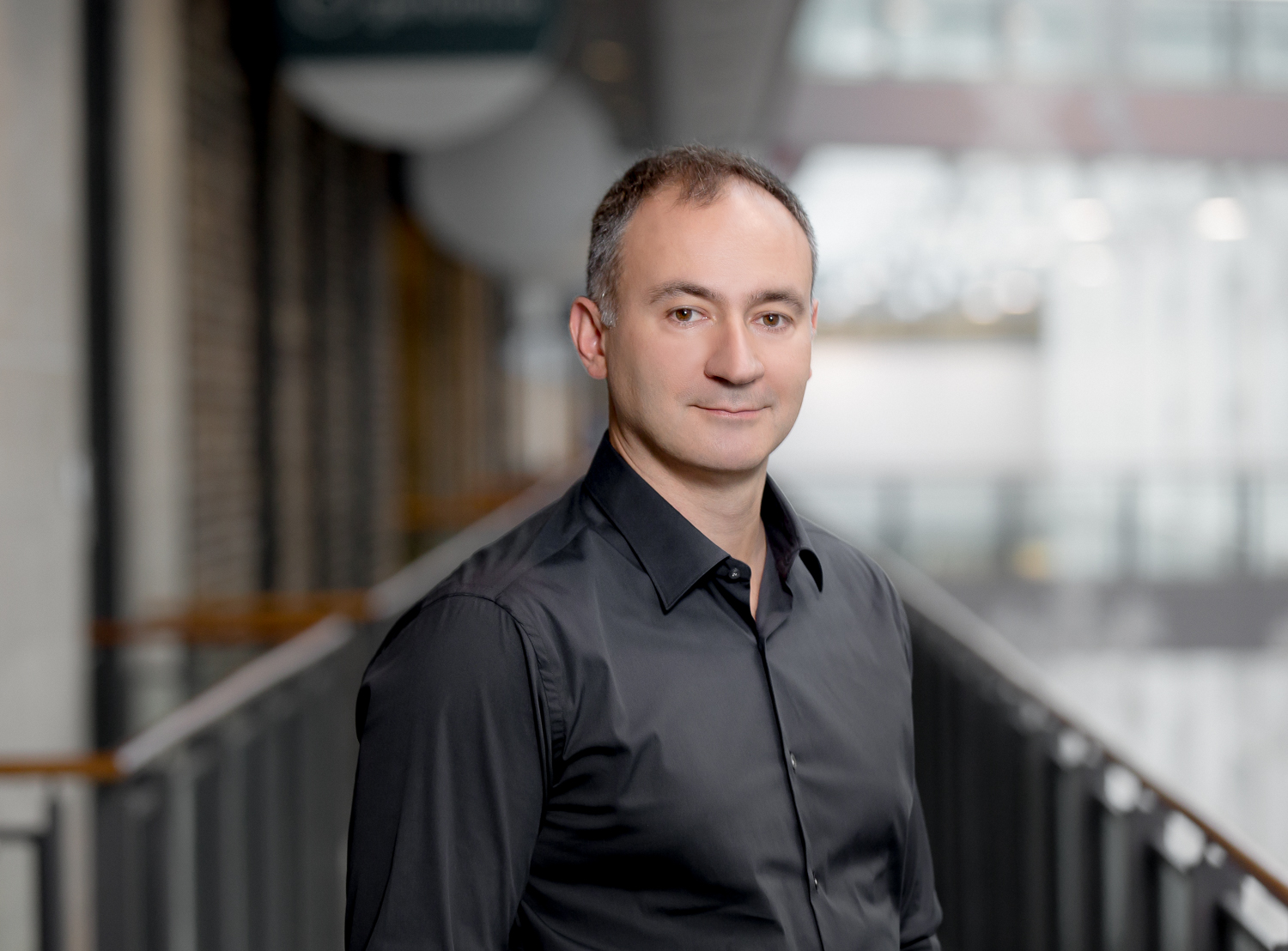
- Born: October 28, 1973 (age 53); Hamilton, Ontario, Canada
- Education: Queen's University (BS); University of Toronto (MS)
- Occupations: Founder and CEO, League Inc.
- Children: 3

Michael Serbinis (born October 28, 1973) is a Canadian businessman based in Toronto, Ontario.

While a student, Serbinis worked for Microsoft on routing algorithms.

He later helped found the cloud-based document storage network company DocSpace. In December 2009, Serbinis co-founded Kobo Inc., a digital reading company. In 2014, Serbinis launched League, a digital health and wellness benefits platform. Along with being a co-founder, he is chief executive officer.

== Personal life ==
Serbinis was educated at Sherwood High School in Hamilton, Ontario. He did his bachelor's degree at the Queen's University at Kingston and master's at the University of Toronto. He is married and has three children..

== Career ==
=== Microsoft ===
At age 19, Serbinis entered the Ontario Engineering Competition. One of the judges, Ken Nickerson, who was an executive at Microsoft at the time hired him on a summer job at Microsoft, where he worked on genetic algorithms and neural networks to develop modern network routing technology.

=== Zip2 ===
Serbinis worked alongside Elon Musk at Zip2. Zip2 primarily provided and licensed online city guide software to newspapers. It was eventually sold to Altavista for $300 million.

=== DocSpace and Critical Path ===
Serbinis then helped found a cloud-based document storage network company called DocSpace. Two years after DocSpace was launched, San Francisco-based Critical Path Inc. agreed to acquire it for $530 million.

In 2001, Serbinis was appointed Chief Technology Officer of Critical Path. Critical Path was a provider of messaging services, working in partnerships with mobile operators, telecommunications companies, ISPs, and enterprises.

=== Indigo and Kobo ===
in 2006, Serbinis joined Indigo, where he was the Chief Information Officer until 2008.

In 2009, Serbinis co-founded Kobo Inc., a digital reading company based in Toronto, Canada. In January 2012, Kobo was acquired by Japanese e-commerce conglomerate Rakuten for $315 million.Following the acquisition, Serbinis continued as CEO until 2014.

=== League Inc. ===
In 2014 Serbinis launched League Inc., a digital health and wellness platform for advanced healthcare consumer experiences. Along with being a co-founder, Serbinis is Chief Executive Officer and Chairman. In 2016, League raised a US$25 million Series A. In June 2017, League expanded its platform into the US. In July 2018, League raised a US$41.7 million Series B. In February 2022, the company raised $95 million in Series C funding led by TDM Growth Partners and Workday Ventures.
