= Ectaco =

ECTACO Inc.
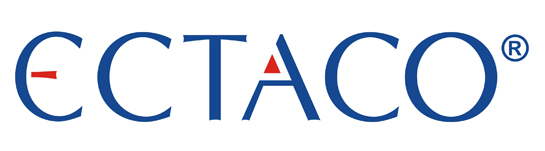
- Type: Private company
- Industry: Hardware; Software; Consumer electronics; Speech recognition
- Founded: Long Island, New York, United States (1989)
- Founder: David Lubinitsky
- Headquarters: 31-21 31st Street, Long Island City, NY, USA
- Area served: Worldwide; United States, United Kingdom, Canada, Germany, Australia, Ukraine, Russia, Spain, Poland, the Czech Republic
- Key people: David Lubinitsky (CEO, Chairman, and Co-founder)
- Subsidiaries: LingvoSoft Co. Voice Methods LLC. Russian Silicon Valley, LLC; ECTACO Developing Center
- Website: ectaco.com

ECTACO Inc. (East-Coast Trading American Company Incorporated) is a US-based developer and manufacturer of hardware and software products for speech recognition and electronic translation. They also make jetBook eBook readers.

== Speech recognition technologies ==
ECTACO is one of the first developers of speech recognition technologies in the field of electronic translation. The speech recognition technologies developed by ECTACO in cooperation with the Defense Advanced Research Projects Agency are used by such international organizations as NATO, the United Nations and the Organization for Security and Co-operation in Europe (OSCE), such state institutions of the US as the United States Army, FBI, United States Department of Homeland Security, Social Security Administration, United States Secret Service, Department of Health Services, United States Postal Service, New York Hospitals etc. The cooperation with US institutions was especially active in 2004–2006. ECTACO devices were also used in the War in Iraq.

The speech recognition system developed by ECTACO allowed troops as well as other US governmental institutions to communicate with non-English-speaking communities, especially in conflict regions. The technology made it possible to translate not only the outgoing message but the incoming one as well, with no dependence of the quality of the translation on the speech particularities of an individual speaker – a service not provided by other companies in the segment of the time.

== Founding ==
ECTACO was founded in the autumn of 1989 in New York, USA, by David Lubinitsky, who was born in Saint Petersburg, Russia. The company was functioning at that time mainly as a reseller of electronic dictionaries from other manufacturers. In 1990 ECTACO started to develop its hardware and software. Russian- and Polish-speaking immigrants in the USA became the primary commercial target group for the products of the company. The first electronic dictionaries of ECTACO supported translation between Russian ↔ English, Polish ↔ English and later German ↔ English language pairs.

== Developing centers ==
In 1998 a software developing center of ECTACO was opened in Saint Petersburg, Russia. The center developed software for app. 300 models with support of 47 languages and started to develop speech recognition software in 2000. The first commercial device of ECTACO with speech recognition appeared on the market in 2002. With cooperation with the Defense Advanced Research Projects Agency the company launched production of the first multi-lingual translation device with ASR (Advanced Speech Recognition).

The hardware developing center of ECTACO is located in Hong-Kong.

== World presence ==
The headquarters of ECTACO are located in Long Island City, New York. In 1993 ECTACO opened a local representation in Russia (Saint Petersburg and Moscow). Within the next 2 years offices were opened in Germany (Berlin), Great Britain (London), the Czech Republic (Prague), Canada (Toronto), Poland (Warsaw) and Ukraine (Kiev). In 2000 a second US office was opened in Chicago.

== Brands ==
Ectaco has several brands which it uses to break its products into categories.

- iTravl - is aimed at travelers and features multiple languages and speech recognition.
- Lingvosoft - encompasses all the translation software available from Ectaco and is available for multiple platforms including Windows, Palm OS, and Pocket PC.
- Partner - this brand houses a general purpose translation dictionary which targets business users and language learners.
- SpeechGuard - is the brand used to market devices to military, police and other government agencies.
- JetBook - a range of eBook readers.
