= Ectaco jetBook =

ECTACO jetBook
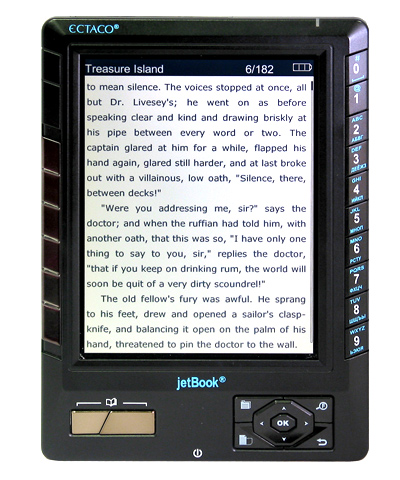
- Manufacturer: Ectaco
- Released: October 2008, globally
- Website: http://www.jetbook.net

ECTACO jetBook is a series of electronic-book reader devices developed by Ectaco. The original device was announced in the United States in October 2008.

== ECTACO jetBook ==
=== Specifications ===
- Size: 153 mm × 109 mm × 10 mm (6 in × 4.2 in × 0.4 in)
- Weight: 7.5oz, 215gr
- Display: 5" (105 mm x 80 mm) Reflective LCD 16-level grayscale (no backlight) 640 × 480 VGA, 160 ppi.
- Language: Support for e-Book contents in most European and Asian languages
- Bookmarks and auto page turn functionality
- Fonts: Adjustable font type and size - 2 built in fonts (Arial and Verdana) in 6 available sizes from 12 pt to 32 pt, page justification or left side alignment
- Screen rotation: support for both portrait & landscape modes
- Built-in English <-> Russian, English <-> Polish, English <-> Spanish, English <-> German and English explanatory dictionaries
- Built-in MP3 player that supports background playback
- The ECTACO jetBook e-Book Reader supports TXT, PDF, FB2, ePUB, MOBI/PRC, RTF, HTML file formats
- DRM formats: Adobe PDF
- image formats: GIF, BMP, PNG and JPEG file formats
- Memory: 128M (112M available for books)
- SD card slot - 2 GB max.
- Internal Li-ion polymer battery - up to 22 hours
- Colors: Burgundy, Gray, White, Black.
- Pre-loaded with Fodor's Travel Guide and CIA World Factbook. A separate version includes a Bible in English, Polish, or Russian, .

=== Features ===
T9 Text Input jetBook uses the advanced T9 text input method that refers back to its pre-installed dictionaries to complete words as you type them (similar to the alphanumeric keypad on cell phones).

On Device File Manager The on device file manager allows you to move, rename and delete files. You can also create and delete folders. See folder system below.

Folder System The Jetbook has a full support for user defined nested folders with the built in file manager or when connected to a PC. The folders displayed on the device mirror the folder structure on the device and the memory card. The folders on the card are combined with the folders on the device. The Jetbooks uses a file naming convention of Author_Name#Title_of_Book.txt in order to list/sort the books by either author or title.

PDF Viewer The PDF viewer was Foxit PDF Reader. It includes Zoom and Pan/Scroll support. Zoom a portion of the document is allowed. The PDF reader does not support reflow. In the latest firmware with DRM support was Foxit reader replaced by Contains Reader Mobile 9.1.1 from Adobe Systems that supports text reflow.

Dictionary Support The dictionaries are in multiple languages and some can be used for translation.

== ECTACO jetBook Lite ==
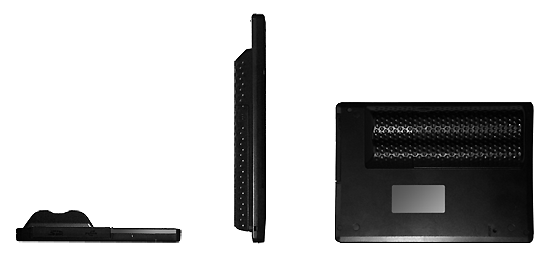
Due to the presence of 4 AA batteries, the back of the device is bulky.

Announced in the United States in January 2010, it differs from the original ECTACO jetBook:

- Size: 153 mm × 109 mm × 10 mm (25 mm), (6 in × 4.2 in × 0.4 in (1.0"))
- Weight: 8.8oz, 250 g with the 4 AA batteries
- SD card allowing up to 32 GB of additional storage
- No audio support
- Runs on regular 4xAA batteries (which increases the weight)

== ECTACO jetBook Mini ==
Introduced in August 2010, main technical differences include:

- size close to 5" LCD; weight 5.8oz
- runs on regular 4xAAA batteries, up to 90 hours runtime on Lithium batteries (and 1 year standby)
- only 3 buttons
- device supports clock and date functions
- audio files are not supported

== jetBook Color ==
Features:

- Built-in memory
- Display: 9.7" Triton Color E Ink screen, 9.68", 1600x1200 px, with special stylus
- Microphone and speaker: Integrated directly into the hardware
- PC connection
- AC adapter connection
- Battery: Lithium-polymer rechargeable battery: 3.7 V, 2350 mAh; up to 10,000 page turns on a single charge
- Dimensions (WxHxD): 270 mm × 188 mm × 11.5 mm (10.6 in × 7.4 in × 0.4 in)
- Weight: 23.4 oz (662 g)
- Supported formats: over 14 different formats including Adobe DRM 9.1, ePub, Mobi, PRC, PDB, RTF, TXT, HTML, PDF, FB2
- Expansion: 4 GB internal memory with microSD card support up to 32 GB

== See also ==
- Comparison of e-book readers
- Comparison of tablet computers
