= E-reader =

Device for reading e-books

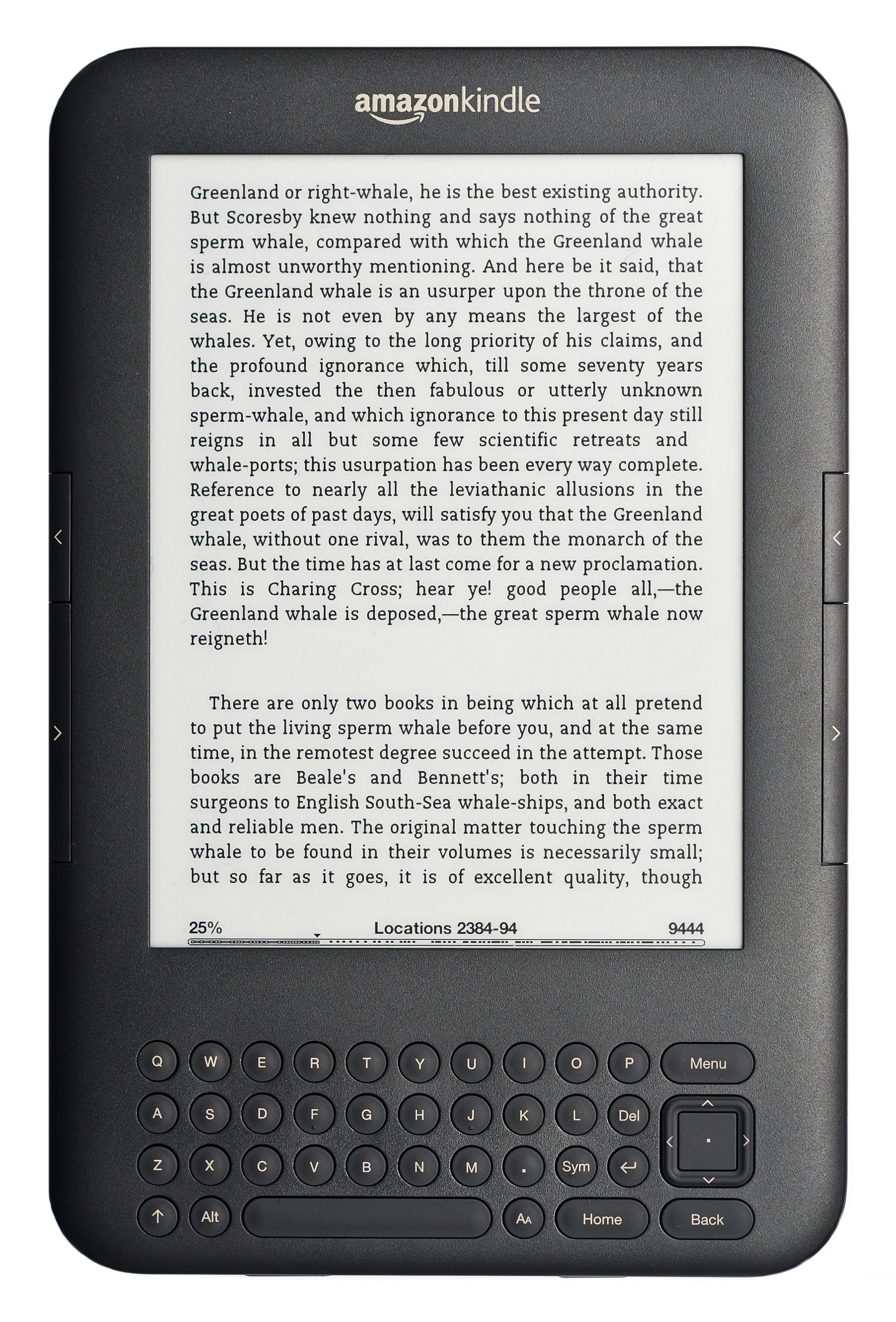
Amazon's Kindle Keyboard e-reader displaying a page of an e-book

An e-reader, also called an e reader or e device, is a mobile electronic device that is designed primarily for the purpose of reading digital e-books and periodicals.

Any device that can display text on a screen may act as an e-reader; however, specialized e-reader devices may optimize portability, readability, and battery life for this purpose. Their main advantage over printed books is portability: an e-reader is capable of storing thousands of books while weighing less than a single one. Another advantage is the convenience provided by add-on features.

== Overview ==
An e-reader is a device designed as a convenient way to read e-books. It is similar in form factor to a tablet computer, but often features electronic paper ("e-ink") rather than an LCD screen. This yields much longer battery life—the battery can last for several weeks—and better readability, similar to that of paper even in sunlight. Drawbacks of this kind of display include a slow refresh rate and (usually) a grayscale-only display, which makes it unsuitable for sophisticated interactive applications such as those found on tablets. This may be perceived as moot or even an advantage, however, inasmuch as the user may simply focus on reading. The Sony Librie, released in 2004 and the precursor to the Sony Reader, was the first e-reader to use electronic paper.

Many e-readers can use the internet through Wi-Fi and the built-in software can provide a link to a digital Open Publication Distribution System (OPDS) library or an e-book retailer, allowing the user to buy, borrow, and receive digital e-books. An e-reader may also download e-books from a computer or read them from a memory card. However, the use of memory cards is decreasing; as the 2010s e-readers lacked a card slot.

== History ==
An idea similar to that of an e-reader is described in a 1930 manifesto written by Bob Brown titled The Readies, which describes "a simple reading machine which I can carry or move around, attach to any old electric light plug and read hundred-thousand-word novels in 10 minutes". His hypothetical machine would use a microfilm-style ribbon of miniaturized text which could be scrolled past a magnifying glass, and would allow the reader to adjust the type size. He envisioned that eventually words could be "recorded directly on the palpitating ether".

The first e-reader was invented by George Yevick and Adnan Wally in 1972. The New York Times ran a feature on the new technology, theorizing its revolutionizing of the publishing industry. The liquid-crystal display prevented washout, unlike modern e-readers. However, development of the personal computer and e-books by Michael S. Hart overshadowed the product and it was never commercialized.

The establishment of the E Ink Corporation in 1997 led to the development of electronic paper, a technology which allows a display screen to reflect light like ordinary paper without the need for a backlight. Among the first commercial e-readers were Sony's Data Discman (which was using Mini CDs with special caddies) and the Rocket eBook. Several others were introduced around 1998, but did not gain widespread acceptance. Electronic paper was incorporated first into the Sony Librie that was released in 2004 and Sony Reader in 2006, followed by the Amazon Kindle, a device which, upon its release in 2007, sold out within five and a half hours. The Kindle includes access to the Kindle Store for e-book sales and delivery.

In 2009, new marketing models for e-books were being developed and a new generation of reading hardware was produced. E-books (as opposed to e-readers) had yet to achieve global distribution. In the United States, the Amazon Kindle model and Sony's PRS-500 were the dominant e-reading devices. By March 2010, some reported that the Barnes & Noble Nook may have been selling more units than the Kindle in the US. The Ectaco jetBook Color was the first color e-reader on the market, but its muted colors were criticized. Since 2021, color E-ink readers have been introduced into the market.

Research released in March 2011 indicated that e-books and e-readers were more popular with the older generation than the younger generation in the UK. The survey, carried out by Silver Poll, found that around 6% of people over 55 owned an e-reader, compared with just 5% of 18- to 24-year-olds. According to an IDC study from March 2011, sales for all e-readers worldwide rose to 12.8 million in 2010; 48% of them were Amazon Kindles, followed by Barnes & Noble Nooks, Pandigital, and Sony Readers (about 800,000 units for 2010).

On January 27, 2010 Apple Inc. launched a multi-function tablet computer called the iPad and announced agreements with five of the six largest publishers that would allow Apple to distribute e-books. The iPad includes a built-in app for e-book reading called iBooks and had the iBookstore for content sales and delivery. The iPad, the first commercially profitable tablet, was followed in 2011 by the release of the first Android-based tablets as well as LCD tablet versions of the Nook and Kindle. Unlike previous dedicated e-readers, tablet computers are multi-functional, utilize LCD touchscreen displays, and are more agnostic to e-book vendor apps, allowing for the installation of multiple e-book reading apps. Many Android tablets accept external media and allow uploading files directly onto the tablet's file system without resorting to online stores or cloud services. Many tablet-based and smartphone-based readers are capable of displaying PDF and DJVU files, which few of the dedicated e-book readers can handle. This opens a possibility to read publications originally published on paper and later scanned into a digital format. While these files may not be considered e-books in their strict sense, they preserve the original look of printed editions. The growth in general-purpose tablet use allowed for further growth in the popularity of e-books in the 2010s.

In 2012, there was a 26% decline in e-reader sales worldwide from a maximum of 23.2 million in 2011. The reason was given for this "alarmingly precipitous decline" was the rise of more general-purpose tablets that provided e-book reading apps along with many other abilities in a similar form factor. In 2013, ABI Research claimed that the decline in the e-reader market was due to the aging of the customer base. In 2014, the industry reported e-reader sales worldwide to be around 12 million, with only Amazon.com and Kobo Inc. distributing e-readers globally and various regional distribution by Barnes & Noble (US/UK), Tolino (Germany), Icarus (Netherlands), PocketBook International (Eastern Europe and Russia) and Onyx Boox (China and Vietnam). At the end of 2015, eMarketer estimated that there were 83.4 million e-reader users in the US, with the number predicted to grow by 3.5% in 2016. In late 2014, PricewaterhouseCoopers predicted that by 2018 e-books would make up over 50% of total consumer publishing revenue in the U.S. and UK, while at that time, e-books were over 30% of the share of the revenue.

Until late 2013, the use of an e-reader was not allowed on airplanes during takeoff and landing. In November 2013, the FAA allowed use of e-readers on airplanes at all times if set to Airplane Mode. European authorities followed this guidance the following month.

== E-reader applications ==
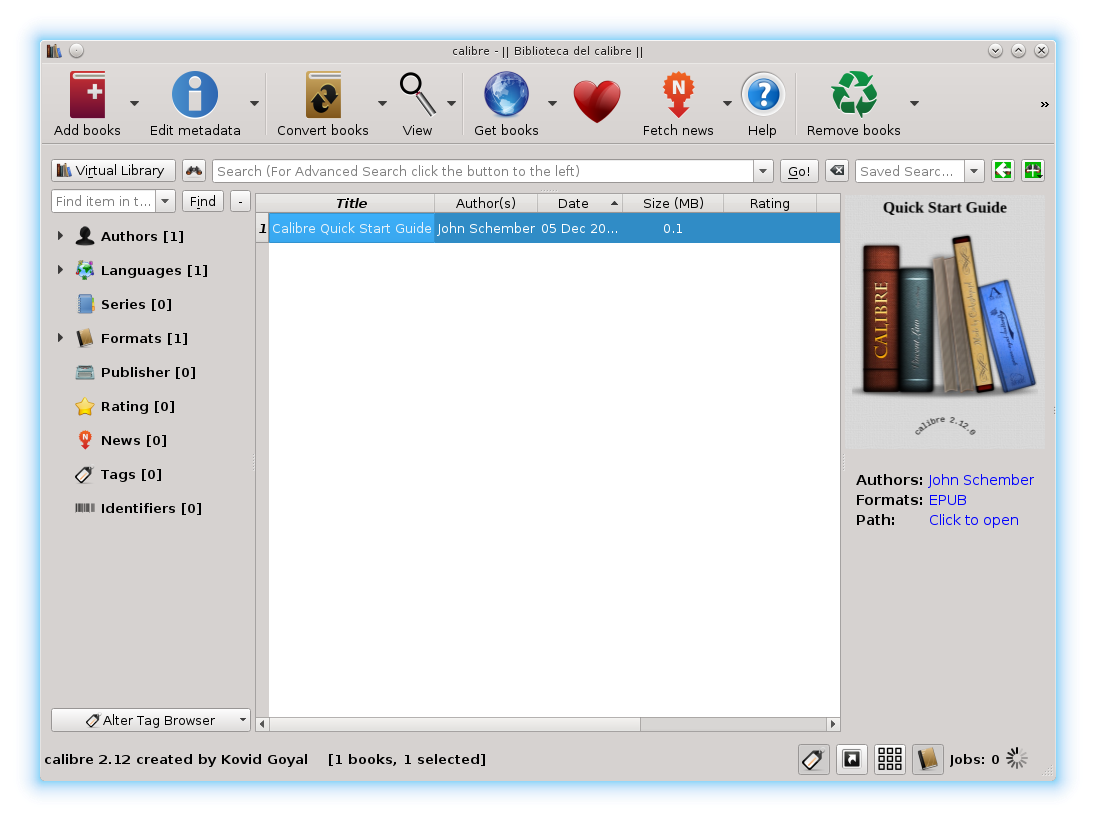
Calibre 2.12 on Arch Linux with the KDE desktop environment

Many of the major book retailers and third-party developers offer e-reader applications for desktops, tablets, and mobile devices, to allow the reading of e-books and other documents independent of dedicated e-book devices. E-reader applications are available for computers running Linux, MacOS, and Windows, as well as for smartphones running Android, iOS and Windows Phone.

== Impact ==
The introduction of e-readers brought substantial changes to the publishing industry, also awakening fears and predictions about the possible disappearance of books and print periodicals.

== Criticism ==
=== Disadvantages of epaper display ===
The graphical design of ebooks underlies the format and technical limits of e-readers because until recently the vast majority of E-ink readers did not support color displays and had a limited resolution and size. As of 2024, however, colour e-readers aren't that rare and there are many colour devices in the market like BOOX Go Color 7 and Kobo Libra Colour which both utilize Kaleido 3 epaper screens supporting up to 4096 colours. The reading experience on epaper displays which are not illuminated depends on the environment lighting condition.

=== Closed ecosystems for retrieving ebooks and lack of freedom ===
E-readers are usually designed to only offer access to the online shop of one provider. This structure is referred to as (digital) ecosystem and helps smaller companies (e.g. Kibano Digireader) to compete against multinational companies (like Amazon, Apple, etc.). On the other hand, customers only have the possibility of purchasing books from a limited selection of ebooks in the online shop (accessible via the e-reader) and therefore do not have the possibility of purchasing e-books from the open market. Because of the use of ecosystems, companies are not forced to compete against each other and therefore the cost of e-books do not decrease. With only the option of using an online shop, the social interaction of buying or borrowing a book disappears. There are, however, notable exceptions such as Onyx Boox and Meebook devices which run an open Android system. Then the users can download and read ebooks from whichever source they prefer either by installing a bookstore app (e.g. Kindle, Kobo and the like), use a web browser or directly download the ebook file. There are also ebook readers with an open Linux system. A notable example is PineNote from Pine64. However, the software ecosystem of these ebook readers usually aren't mature as mainstream options in the market.

In the EU, media products, including paper books, often have a tax reduction. Therefore, the VAT for conventional books was often lower than that of e-books. In legal terms, e-books were considered a service since it was regarded as a temporary lease of the product. Therefore, ebook prices were often similar to paper book prices, even if the production of ebooks has a lower cost. In October 2018, the EU allowed its member countries to charge the same VAT for ebooks as for paper books.

Richard Stallman has expressed concern about the perceived loss of freedom or privacy that comes with e-readers, namely the inability to read whatever a reader prefers without the possibility of being tracked.

== Positive aspects ==
E-readers can hold thousands of books limited only by their memory and use the same physical space as a conventional book. Most electronic paper displays are not back-illuminated and therefore seem to cause no more eye strain than a traditional book and less eye strain than LCD screens, with a longer battery life. Features such as the ability to adjust font size and spacing can help people who have difficulty reading or dyslexia. Some e-readers link to definitions or translations of key words. Amazon notes that 85% of its e-reader users look up a word while reading.

E-readers can instantly download content from supported public libraries by using apps like OverDrive.

== Popular e-readers ==
- Amazon (Global): Kindle, Kindle Paperwhite, Kindle Voyage, Kindle Oasis, Kindle Oasis 2, Kindle Scribe
- Barnes & Noble (US/UK): Nook, Nook GlowLight, Nook GlowLight Plus
- Bookeen (France): Cybook Opus, Cybook Orizon, Cybook Odyssey, Cybook Odyssey HD FrontLight
- Kobo (Global): Kobo Touch, Kobo Glo, Kobo Mini, Kobo Aura, Kobo Aura HD
- Onyx Boox (Europe, Russia, China and Vietnam): Onyx Boox Max2, Onyx Boox Note
- PocketBook (Europe and Russia): PocketBook Touch, PocketBook Mini, PocketBook Touch Lux, PocketBook Color Lux, PocketBook Aqua
- Sony Reader (Japan)
- Tolino (Germany): Tolino Shine, Tolino Shine 2 HD, Tolino Vision, Tolino Vision 2

== Alternative e-readers devices or platform ==
- Apple: iPad and iPad Mini
- Amazon: Fire Tablet
- Android based tablet

== See also ==
- Comparison of e-readers
- Supporting platforms for e-book formats
- Open Publication Distribution System
