= Kobo Inc. =

Canadian ebook and audiobook company

Rakuten Kobo Inc.
- Formerly: Shortcovers (2009); Kobo Inc. (2009–2016)
- Type: Subsidiary
- Industry: Bookselling, Consumer electronics
- Founded: December 2009; 16 years ago
- Founder: Michael Serbinis
- Headquarters: Toronto, Ontario, Canada
- Area served: Worldwide
- Key people: Takahito Aiki (chairman); Michael Tamblyn (president and CEO)
- Products: E-books; Audiobooks; E-readers; Reading applications
- Number of employees: Approximately 600
- Parent: Rakuten Group (2012–present)
- Website: www.kobo.com

Rakuten Kobo, commonly known as Kobo, is a Canadian company that sells ebooks, audiobooks and e-reader devices. The company is headquartered in Toronto, Ontario, Canada, and is a subsidiary of the Japanese technology conglomerate Rakuten Group.

Kobo operates a global digital reading platform that distributes e-books and audiobooks through its online store and mobile applications. The company also develops the Kobo eReader line of electronic reading devices.

Kobo was founded in 2009 as Shortcovers by Michael Serbinis and was later renamed Kobo Inc. The company was acquired by Rakuten in 2012 for $315 million and became part of Rakuten's global digital content ecosystem.

The name Kobo is an anagram of the word book.

== History ==
Kobo originated as Shortcovers, a cloud eReading service launched by the Canadian bookstore chain Indigo Books and Music in February 2009. In December 2009, Indigo renamed the service Kobo and spun it off into an independent company. Indigo retained its majority ownership, with additional investors including Borders, Cheung Kong Holdings, and REDgroup Retail, taking minority stakes. Japanese retail conglomerate Rakuten acquired the company from these owners in January 2012 and launched Kobo's e-readers in Japan a few months later.

In 2014, co-founder and CEO Michael Serbinis stepped down from his position and became vice chairman. He was succeeded by Takahito Aiki, who had been with Rakuten since 2007, and had most recently served as CEO of Fusion Communications. Aiki led Rakuten Kobo through parent company Rakuten’s acquisition of OverDrive, an e-book platform that provided e-books and digital audio to libraries and schools. OverDrive’s catalog was used to expand Rakuten’s Kobo e-reader and e-book store.

In 2016, Michael Tamblyn, president of Rakuten Kobo since 2014, was named the company's new CEO.

On 23 May 2016, Waterstones announced it had sold its e-book business to Rakuten Kobo, and as of 14 June 2016, users were required to access their e-books via Kobo's e-book site.

During the COVID pandemic, Kobo worked with governments, publishers, and retail partners to provide more than 20 million free books through the “Stay Home and Read” programme. The company reported that romance and mystery novels continued to be bestsellers during the pandemic and that there was a rise in books for kids and young adults.

In 2020, Rakuten Kobo sold OverDrive, the digital library lending platform it had owned since 2015. Kobo e-readers retained integration with the platform’s library borrowing services.

Two years later, in 2022, Rakuten Kobo’s catalog and products were available in 76 languages and 190 countries. The company then expanded into Malaysia. Rakuten Kobo launched their e-readers in the country and opened a localized bookstore to provide access to Kobo’s global catalog and Malaysian titles. 2022 also saw Kobo adopt Arabic as a primary browsing language.

In 2026, the company had grown to reach 195 countries. It expanded into the Thai market through a partnership with Meb Corporation, an e-book distributor. The two companies launched three e-readers in Thailand: Kobo Libra Colour, Kobo Clara Colour, and Kobo Clara BW.

== Products ==
Rakuten Kobo’s e-readers allow users to purchase books directly from the Rakuten Kobo store, rent books from the library using the Libby/OverDrive app, or read e-books purchased from other stores.

Kobo’s e-readers utilize ePaper screens with E Ink technology. They use Wi-Fi to sync a user's book collection and bookmarks with Kobo's cloud service, which can also be accessed from Kobo eReading apps for Windows and macOS computers, Android and iOS smartphones.

In 2025, Rakuten Kobo made Instapaper available on most of its e-readers and discontinued support for Pocket, which had shut down. With Instapaper, users can save articles from the internet and read them on their Kobo devices.

A year later, in 2026, Rakuten Kobo launched an integration with Storygraph, a social reading platform. The integration exists within the Kobo app and the company’s e-readers and allows a user’s reading progress to automatically sync to a Storygraph account.

Category	Model	Release Year	Features	WiFi/Bluetooth	Waterproof	Storage	Notes
eReaders Main article: Kobo eReader	Kobo Forma	2018	Added physical buttons and a choice of orientations		Yes	8GB	
eReaders Main article: Kobo eReader	Kobo Clara HD	2018			No	8GB	The original Clara had the first Carta screens; as of Feb 2023 no longer available in the U.S.A.
eReaders Main article: Kobo eReader	Kobo Libra H20	2019	ComfortLight PRO screen technology				
eReaders Main article: Kobo eReader	Kobo Nia			WiFi 4			An entry-level e-reader; replaced the discontinued Kobo Aura
eReaders Main article: Kobo eReader	Kobo Sage		USB-C port	Bluetooth; WiFi 5	IPX8 waterproof rating	32G	Worked with a stylus
eReaders Main article: Kobo eReader	Kobo Elipsa	2021		Bluetooth			An e-reader and smart notebook that allows users to write on the screen
eReaders Main article: Kobo eReader	Kobo Clara 2E	2022		Bluetooth; WiFi	IPX8 waterproof rating	16GB	Made from recycled plastic; can purchase books from the Rakuten Kobo store, borrow books using the built-in Libby app, or load non-protected books from other sources
eReaders Main article: Kobo eReader	Kobo Elipsa 2E	2023	Includes basic notebook and advanced notebooks; import and export files to Dropbox or Google Drive	Bluetooth; WiFi			Comes with Stylus 2
eReaders Main article: Kobo eReader	Kobo Libra Colour	2024	Full-colour display; supports the Kobo Stylus 2; physical buttons; works with the Libby OverDrive library app; sync with Google Drive, Dropbox, or Pocket to import PDFs and articles; access Kobo Plus from the e-reader	Bluetooth; WiFi			Body 85% recycled plastic; packaging 100% recyclable, ink biodegradable; e-reader is repairable thanks to a partnership with iFixit
eReaders Main article: Kobo eReader	Kobo Clara Colour	2024		Bluetooth; WiFi			
Discontinued eReaders	Kobo Original						
Discontinued eReaders	Kobo WiFi						
Discontinued eReaders	Kobo Mini						
Discontinued eReaders	Kobo Touch	2010					
Discontinued eReaders	Kobo Glo						
Discontinued eReaders	Kobo Aura HD						
Discontinued eReaders	Kobo Aura						
Discontinued eReaders	Kobo Aura H20						
Discontinued eReaders	Kobo Glo HD						
Discontinued eReaders	Kobo Touch 2.0						
Discontinued eReaders	Kobo Aura Edition 2						
Discontinued eReaders	Kobo Aura ONE						
Discontinued Tablets	Kobo Vox	2011	7-inch Android tablet				
Discontinued Tablets	Kobo Arc	2012					A family of Android tablets; refreshed in 2013; discontinued in 2014

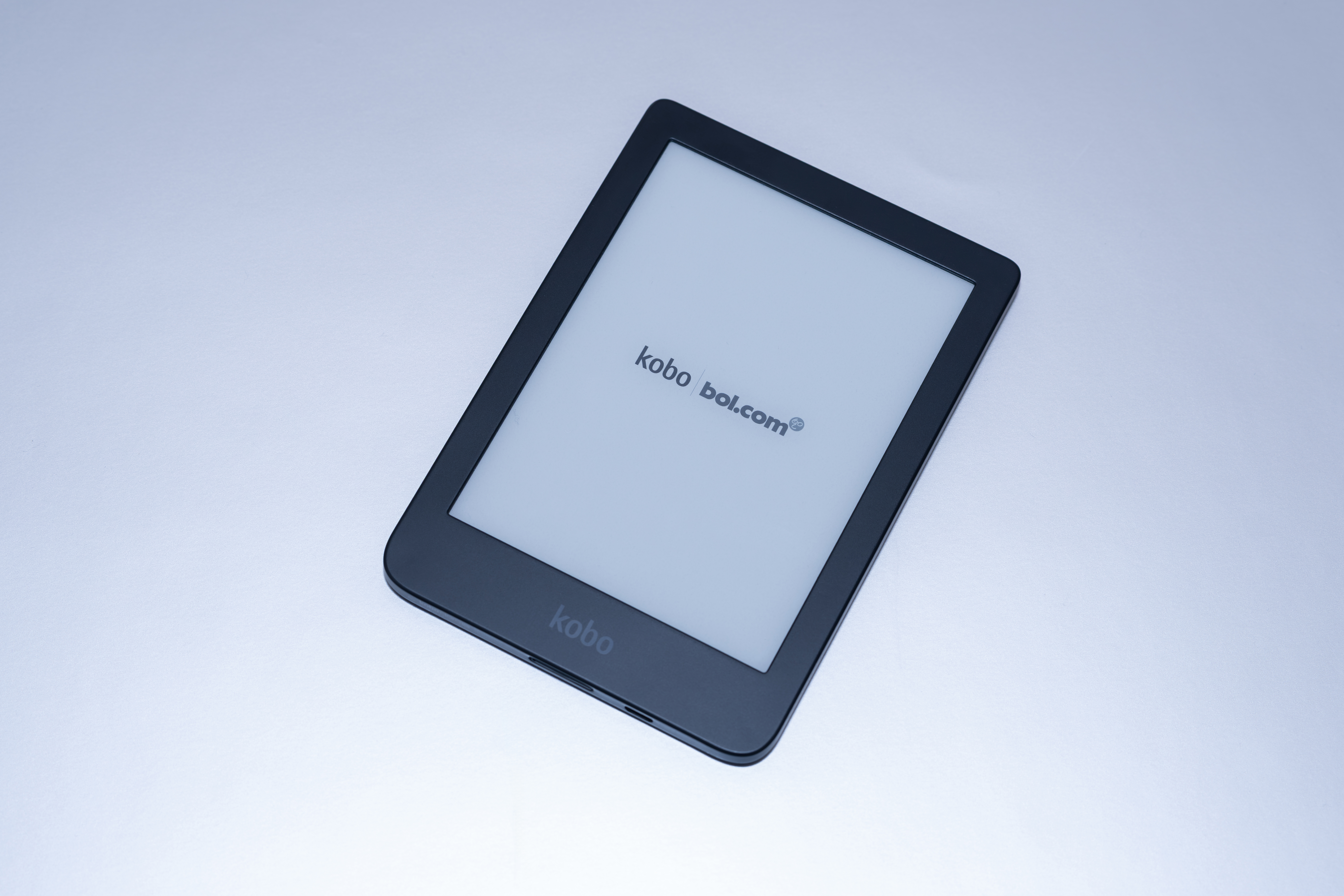
E-Book-Reader: Kobo Clara HD

=== Applications ===
The Kobo Books app is available for Windows, macOS, iOS/iPadOS, and Android. It lets users download books from the Kobo store, import books saved as PDFs or EPUBs, and access the Kobo Plus subscription service.

In June 2015, Kobo received a Top Developer badge in the Google Play store. In 2017, Kobo acquired Shelfie, an app that organises personal libraries. It is no longer active.

=== Kobo Plus Subscription Service ===
Kobo Plus is the company's unlimited audiobook and eBook subscription service. It was first released in the Netherlands and Belgium in 2017 and then expanded to Canada in 2020. In 2021, Kobo signed an agreement with LeYa, a Portuguese publishing group, and launched Kobo Plus e_LeYa, which made exclusive content available in Portugal.

As of May 2021, Kobo Plus offered 599,000 eBooks and 94,000 audiobooks. Books are available in many languages. Readers can choose to subscribe to only eBooks or to expand the service with Kobo Plus Listening, which includes audiobooks.

=== Store and publishing ===
Kobo's bookstore was opened in 2009. Content sold on the Kobo Bookstore includes eBooks, Audiobooks, newspapers, and magazines. The majority of titles are sold in the open ePub format, albeit with Digital rights management.

Several digital bookstores have closed down and transferred their users to Kobo's bookstore. They include the defunct Borders, as well as the Sony Reader Store. Both have provided tools for users to migrate purchases and information to Kobo's offering.

On 17 July 2012, Kobo launched a self-publishing platform called Kobo Writing Life (KWL). Key features of Kobo Writing Life include "deep analytics", allowing authors to track sales in real-time; a "learning centre" to guide newcomers in digital publishing; and allowing an author to sell books globally.

In 2019, KWL began offering self-publishing opportunities for Audiobooks.

=== Emerging Writer Prize ===
The Kobo Emerging Writer Prize awards three first-time Canadian authors with Ca$10,000 each. The awards are given in three categories, Literary Fiction, Nonfiction, and Genre Fiction, with the genre selection changing each year. Traditionally published, and self-published books are eligible, and authors receive marketing and communications support during their winning year.

In 2021, the award's seventh year, the winning authors were: Michelle Good, author of Five Little Indians (Fiction); Eternity Martis, author of They Said This Would Be Fun (Nonfiction); and Emily Hepditch, author of The Woman in the Attic (Mystery).

At the same time as the Libra 2, the Kobo Sage was also introduced as a new top model. It has an 8" E-Ink Carta 1200 display with a resolution of 1440 × 1920 pixels and 32 GB internal memory. A Bluetooth module and a USB-C port have also been installed. In addition, as with the Elipsa, it is possible to capture notes on the device with a stylus.

== Sales and market share ==
Kobo sells its devices online and through physical retail channels. The company's strategic partnerships have included Cheung Kong Holdings, WHSmith, Whitcoulls, FNAC, Livraria Cultura, and Eslite Bookstore. Kobo partnered with Australian online bookseller Booktopia and also has a programme partnering with independent bookstores to sell their devices.

In 2012, Wired named Kobo as the "only global competitor to Amazon [in the eBook market]" with over 20% of the worldwide market.

Kobo Inc. released eBook reading data collected from over 21 million readers worldwide in 2014. Some of the data said that only 45% of UK readers finished the bestselling eBook The Goldfinch.

As of August 2018, Amazon's Kindle eReader had an 83.6% share of the U.S. eReader market while Kobo had a 13.4% share.

=== Venture with Walmart ===
In 2018, the company and Walmart contracted to allow the latter to sell Kobo audiobooks, eBooks and eReaders in the U.S. This was the first venture into eBooks for the retailer which also began selling the Kobo eReaders. Walmart installed eReader stations in over 1,000 stores. Their eBook Web site was listing over 6 million titles. The retailer also began to offer subscriptions for audiobooks at a monthly fee.

=== Venture with Bol ===
In the Netherlands, Bol.com is contracted to sell Kobo audiobooks, eBooks and eReaders.
