= Kobo Arc =

2012 tablet computer by Kobo Inc.

- Developer: Kobo Inc.
- Type: Tablet computer
- Generation: 2nd
- Released: November 2012; 14 years ago
- Introductory price: 16 GiB $199.99 CAD, 32 GiB $249.99 CAD, 64 GiB $299.99 CAD
- Operating system: Android 4.1 Jelly Bean
- CPU: 1.5 GHz dual-core processor
- Display: 7" IPS display, 1280×800 HD resolution; 215 ppi; displays 16 million colours; clarity at extra wide viewing angles (+/−) 89 degrees
- Sound: Built-in dual front-facing speakers and universal 3.5 mm stereo headphone jack with SRS TruMedia™ sound
- Camera: 720p HD front-facing camera (1.3 MP)
- Connectivity: Micro USB 2.0 (type B) WiFi 802.11 b/g/n
- Dimensions: 189 mm (7.4 in) H 120 mm (4.7 in) W 11.5 mm (0.45 in) D
- Weight: 364 g (12.8 oz)
- Predecessor: Kobo Vox
- Website: www.kobo.com/koboarc

The Kobo Arc, a 7-inch tablet originally ran on Android 4.0.4 Ice Cream Sandwich and running on Android 4.1 Jelly Bean, is manufactured by Kobo Inc. It was released in November 2012. The tablet has access to Google Play applications.

The 2013 refresh of the Kobo Arc HD includes 7-inch and 10-inch versions. All use Android 4.2.2 (Jelly Bean). The Arc 10HD has 2560×1600 resolution, Tegra 4 quad-core processor 1.8 GHz, 1.3 MP front camera, two speakers, 2 GB of RAM, 16 GB of storage, Bluetooth 4.0 and Miracast. The Arc 7HD has 1920×1200 resolution, Tegra 3 at 1.7 GHz, a 1.3 MP front camera, 1 GiB of RAM, and either 16 or 32 GiB of storage. The Arc 7 is a 7-inch tablet with a 1024×600 resolution.

== 2nd Generation ==
In August 2013, Kobo unveiled three additional Kobo Arc tablets. These were the Kobo Arc 10HD, Kobo Arc 7HD, and Kobo Arc 7. The Kobo Arc 10HD is a 10.1-inch tablet with 2560×1600 resolution, while Kobo Arc 7HD is a 7-inch tablet with 1920×1200 resolution, and Kobo Arc 7 is a 7-inch tablet with a 1024×600 resolution.

== Specs ==
Features	Description
Available Colors	Black & white
Wireless Connectivity	WiFi 802.11 b/g/n and Micro USB
Audio	Built-in dual front-facing speakers and universal 3.5 mm stereo headphone jack with SRS TruMedia™ sound
Device Size	189×120 mm
Device Depth	11.5 mm
Weight	364 grams
Diagonal Display Size	7 inches (180 mm) IPS Display
Screen Qualities	1280×800 HD resolution; 215 ppi; displays 16 million colours; clarity at extra wide viewing angles (+/−) 89 degrees
Navigation	Home, Back and Menu touch sensors, Power and Volume buttons
Processor	1.5 GHz dual-core processor: TI OMAP 4470; 1 GB RAM
Operating System	Open access to Android Jelly Bean 4.1
Storage	16, 32, or 64 GB models
Battery Life	10 hours of reading; 2+ weeks of standby
Content	Nearly 3 million books
Social Reading	Reading Life, Kobo Pulse, Facebook Timeline
Fonts	TypeGenius, font-tuning engine designed for the best readability. Choice of 7 font styles, 24 font sizes and new with Kobo Arc, adjustable font sizes and weight.
Advanced Features	Wireless display capability to stream multimedia content to your TV with a compatible WiFi Direct A/V adaptor. Android customization features such as resizable widgets and face unlock. SRS TruMedia™ sound specifically tuned for tablets.
Software	Tapestries – Kobo's exclusive interface for easy content discovery
Supported File Formats	Books: ePUB, including fixed layout and enhanced ePUB. Images: JPG, PNG, GIF, BMP; Audio: MP3, AAC, 3GP, MP4, M4A, FLAC, OGG, WAV, MID. Video Formats: 3GP, MP4, WebM
Web Browsing	Android web browser
Media	Music Player, Photo Gallery, Video Player
Pre-loaded Apps	Facebook, Twitter and Skype. Stream music from Rdio, access your magazines and newspapers through Zinio and PressReader. Google apps: Google Play, Gmail, YouTube, Google Maps, StreetView, Calendar, Contacts, Google+ and Google Chat.

== See also ==
- Comparison of e-readers
