= Kobo eReader =

Family of e-book readers

Kobo

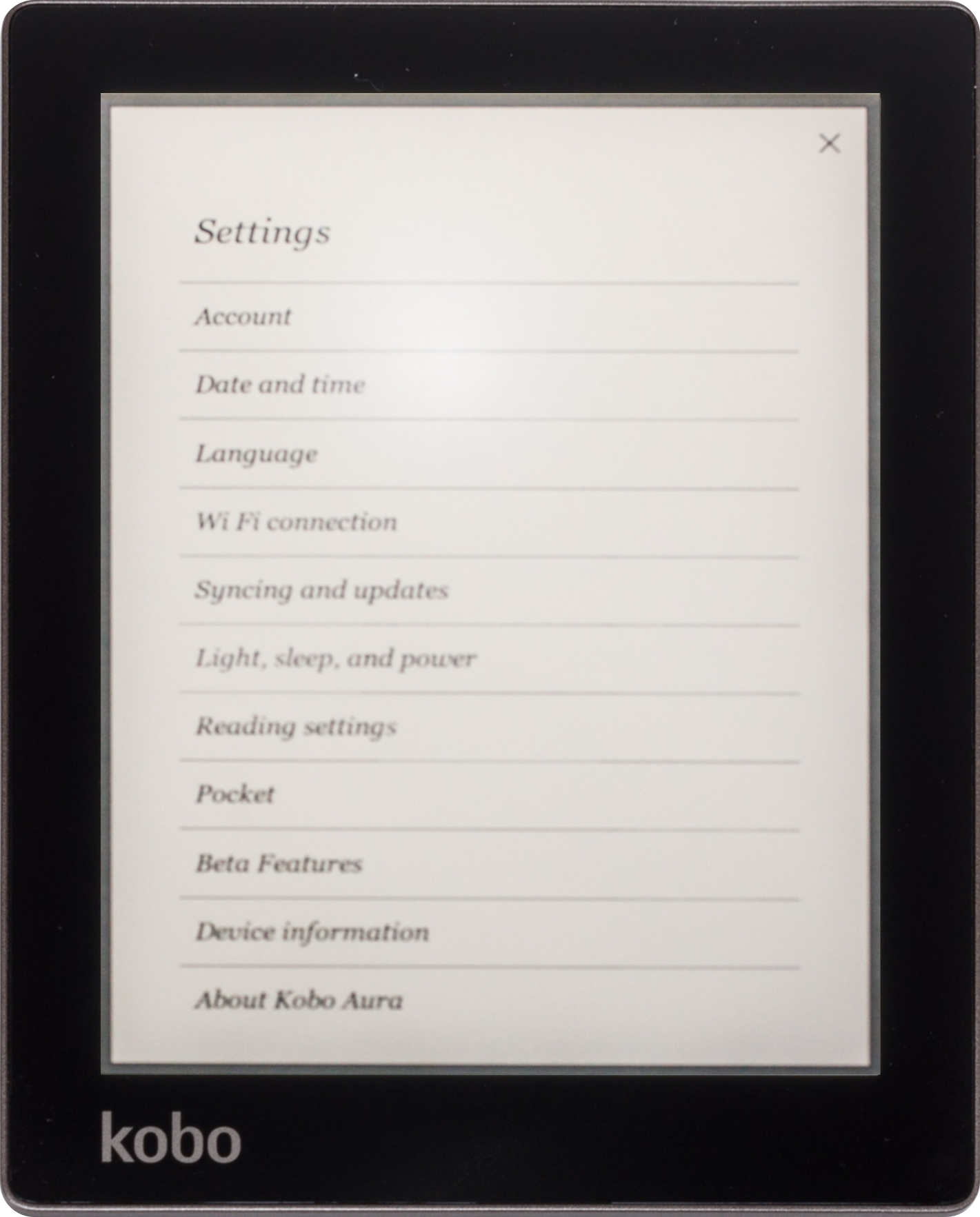
- Kobo Aura, Kobo's former baseline e-reader
- Manufacturer: Kobo Inc.
- Type: e-Reader
- Operating system: Kobo firmware
- Power: Internal li-ion rechargeable battery
- Website: www.kobo.com

The Kobo eReader is an e-reader produced by Toronto-based Kobo Inc (a subsidiary of Rakuten). Kobo Inc. originated in December 2009 through a Indigo Books and Music spinoff of their short-lived e-book marketplace, Shortcovers. The original e-reader model was released in May 2010 and was marketed as a minimalist alternative to the more expensive e-book readers available at the time. Like most e-readers, the Kobo uses an electronic ink screen. "Kobo" is an anagram of "book".

In November 2011, Rakuten and Kobo Inc. announced a definitive agreement under which Rakuten would acquire 100% of Kobo's shares for US$315 million in cash. The acquisition closed in January 2012 following approval by Canadian regulatory authorities. The Arc tablet series, released between 2011 and 2013, was based on LCD technology instead.

== History ==
Kobo began as Shortcovers, a digital reading application operated by the Canadian bookstore chain Indigo Books and Music and formally spun off as the independent company Kobo Inc. in December 2009, with Indigo retaining approximately 58% ownership and investors including Borders Group, Cheung Kong Holdings, and REDgroup Retail taking minority stakes. The company raised CA$16 million in initial financing at the time of the spin-off.

In November 2011, Rakuten announced a definitive agreement to acquire 100% of Kobo's outstanding shares for US$315 million in cash, describing the deal as a step toward expanding its global e-commerce business into downloadable media. Kobo's headquarters, management team, and employees were to remain in Toronto upon closing. The acquisition closed in January 2012 following approval by Canadian regulatory authorities.

== E-ink devices ==
=== Current ===
==== Common attributes ====
All Kobo e-readers share a unique pagination system which gives users the option to either count and reference pages separately within each chapter, or in the book as a whole. Up until an update in January 2022, Kobo readers required connection to the Internet during the initial setup phase and did not work until they were connected to Kobo's servers; however, they now support "sideload mode", which allows the reader to be used without registering it to a Kobo account. Kobo e-readers support viewing KEPUB (Kobo's proprietary ebook format based on the EPUB format), EPUB, Adobe PDF, plain text, HTML, and unprotected Mobipocket (MOBI, PRC) e-books. Some also support other formats, such as ZIM, unofficially.

==== Kobo Elipsa 2E ====
The Kobo Elipsa 2E was released on 19 April 2023. It has a 10.3-inch E-Ink display at 1404 x 1872 pixels with a density of 227 ppi, 32 GB of storage, 2 GHz CPU, WiFi 802.11 ac/b/g/n, Bluetooth, USB-C, and an updated stylus.

==== Kobo Clara BW ====
The Kobo Clara BW was released in April 2024. It is one of the first Kobo devices marketed as repairable, and the first with a Carta 1300 display. Its accessory covers are compatible with the Kobo Clara Colour.

In April 2025, Kobo quietly released a mid-cycle hardware revision of the Clara BW, designated model P365, representing the first time Kobo had upgraded the battery capacity partway through a device's release cycle. The P365 features a larger battery of 1,900 mAh, compared to 1,500 mAh in the original N365 model. The P365 is manufactured by Top Victory Electronics rather than Netronix, which had produced all previous Kobo devices. The revised model was initially distributed primarily in European and other international markets rather than in Canada and the United States.

==== Kobo Clara Colour ====
The Kobo Clara Colour was released on 30 April 2024. It is also marketed as repairable, with a 6-inch E-Ink Kaleido 3 color display. Its accessory covers are compatible with the Kobo Clara BW.

A white version of the device with the same technical specifications was released on 23 September 2025 after popular demand.

==== Kobo Libra Colour ====
The Kobo Libra Colour was released on 30 April 2024. It is marketed as repairable, with a 7-inch E-Ink Kaleido 3 color display and support for the Kobo Stylus 2 in all applications.

=== Discontinued ===
==== Kobo eReader ====
Kobo Inc. announced its first e-reader on 24 March 2010, at the CTIA show. The device was officially released on 1 May 2010. It had expandable memory, holding an additional 4 GB via an SD slot and limited wireless connectivity via Bluetooth to select Blackberry wireless devices. It was available in black or white and came preloaded with 100 public domain books. It was manufactured by Netronix Inc., a Taiwan based company with factories in Taiwan and China.

The pricing strategy of the original Kobo, at US$149, was to rival the Amazon Kindle, which was US$110 more expensive. However, in June 2010, just after the Kobo was released, Amazon dropped the price of the Kindle to US$189. Its pricing strategy in Australia was similarly aggressive where it was available for A$199, again A$100 less than the Kindle. Borders Australia said that they hoped to sell high volumes of the Kobo to drive up sales at their e-content store.

The original Kobo received a mediocre review from CNET. The review said that, while the Kobo was compact, lightweight and affordable, the lack of Wi-Fi or 3G made it outdated, especially when there were similarly priced eReaders available with those features.

In December 2010, the original Kobo's feature set was updated with a firmware update to more closely match the Wifi model.

==== Kobo Wi-Fi ====
A new model with Wi-Fi capability was released on 15 October 2010. It included an improved processor, screen, and new colour choices (porcelain/metallic silver, porcelain/pearlized lilac, and onyx). The SD expansion had been improved to claim a capacity for up to 10,000 books with a 32 GB SD card. Other improvements included a longer battery life and a built-in dictionary.

Like the original model, the Wi-Fi model came pre-loaded with 100 public domain books.

==== Kobo Touch ====
The Kobo Touch was released in June 2011. It introduced an infrared 6-inch touchscreen interface. Other improvements compared to the Kobo Wi-Fi included an E Ink Pearl screen, a faster processor capable of PDF panning, 802.11n capability, and reduced size and weight.

==== Kobo Glo ====
The Kobo Glo was an e-reader released on 6 September 2012. It was a front-lit, touch-based E Ink reader. The Kobo Glo supported most ebook standards, including EPUB. It had a 6-inch touchscreen, 1024 × 768 resolution, 213 ppi, 6.53 oz, 2 GB of storage, and supported microSD.

==== Kobo Mini ====
The Kobo Mini was smaller, at 5-inch, and lighter than standard ebook readers. It was released on 6 September 2012. It had 2 GB internal storage and Wi-Fi. The 5" E Ink Vizplex screen had a resolution of 800 x 600 with 200 ppi.

==== Kobo Aura HD ====
The Aura HD was a limited-edition device released on 25 April 2013. It had a 6.8-inch E Ink display, with a high resolution of 1440 × 1080 with 265 ppi. It was 8.47 oz and had a microSD expansion slot. Other improvements compared to the Kobo Touch included a built-in "ComfortLight" LED light, a faster processor (1 GHz), twice the onboard storage (4 GB), and twice the battery life (estimated at two months).

==== Kobo Aura ====
The Kobo Aura is the baseline e-reader with a 6-inch E Ink ClarityScreen display with 1024 × 768 resolution, 16-level grey scale, and a built-in LED front-light. It has 4 GB storage, weighs 173 g (6.1 oz), has two months of battery life, a Freescale i.MX507 1 GHz processor, and a microSD expansion slot. It was released in September 2013.

==== Kobo Aura H_{2}O ====
The Aura H_{2}O, released on 1 October 2014, was the second commercial waterproof e-reader. It had an upgraded version of the Aura HD's 6.8-inch E Ink Carta display with a resolution of 1440 × 1080 with 265 ppi. While its screen was improved over the Aura HD, it contained the same processor, on-board storage, and software as the Aura HD, and had dust/waterproofing – certified to be immersed for up to 30 minutes in up to 1 meter of water with its port cover closed.

==== Kobo Glo HD ====
The Kobo Glo HD, released on 1 May 2015, is an e-reader with an E Ink Carta screen and is the successor to 2012's Glo. It has 4gb of storage. It has a 6-inch screen in a resolution of 1448 × 1072, or 300 ppi, matching the resolution of the Kindle Voyage.

==== Kobo Touch 2.0 ====
The Kobo Touch 2.0 was released on 8 September 2015, as an entry-level e-reader with an E Ink Pearl 6-inch display with a resolution of 800×600 and 167 ppi. The exterior is similar in appearance to the Kobo Glo HD and it has a 1 GHz Freescale i.MX6 Solo Lite Processor and 4 GB of internal storage.

==== Kobo Aura One ====
The Kobo Aura One was released on 6 September 2016, and it is the first e-reader with a 7.8-inch E Ink Carta HD waterproof touchscreen display with a 300 ppi screen. The Aura One weighs 252 grams and measures 195 by 138.5 by 6.9 mm. It has Wi-Fi, 8 GB internal storage, and 512 MB RAM. The Aura One is lit by nine white LEDs and eight RGB LEDs around the frame. The additional RGB LEDs allow the device to have a night reading mode that limits the blue light that comes from white LEDs. The Aura One was the first Kobo eReader with built-in OverDrive support.

==== Kobo Aura Edition 2 ====
The Kobo Aura Edition 2 was released with the Kobo Aura One in September 2016 as "a refreshed version of a beloved classic". It has a 6-inch E Ink Carta display with a resolution of 1024 × 768 at 212 ppi. The exterior styling is similar to the Kobo Aura One. Unlike the original Kobo Aura, there is no MicroSD slot. The specifications are otherwise similar to the original Kobo Aura.

==== Kobo Aura H_{2}O Edition 2 ====
The Kobo Aura H_{2}O Edition 2 was released in May 2017. It has a 6.8-inch E Ink HD Carta waterproof IPX8 display at 265 ppi. Its LED light, called the "ComfortLight PRO", can automatically reduce blue-light exposure during the night to lower the screen's effect on sleep.

==== Kobo Clara HD ====
The Clara HD was released on 5 June 2018. It has a 6-inch, 300 ppi screen.

==== Kobo Forma ====
The Kobo Forma was released in November 2018. It has an 8-inch, 300 ppi E-Ink display that can be held by right- and left-handed people, and it can be flipped horizontally. It has physical page up and page down buttons to flip pages.

==== Kobo Libra H_{2}O ====
Kobo Libra H_{2}O was released on 15 September 2019.

The Libra features a 7-inch E Ink Carta HD display with a resolution of 1,680 x 1,264 and 300 ppi.

==== Kobo Nia ====
The Kobo Nia was released on 21 July 2020. It has a 6-inch E-Ink display at 1024 x 758 pixels, with a density of 212 ppi.

==== Kobo Libra 2 ====
The Libra 2 was released in October 2021.

The Kobo Sage and Kobo Libra 2 are the first Kobo ereaders to come with Bluetooth support; thus, audiobooks can be played from the e-reader with the use of an external Bluetooth speaker. The Kobo Libra 2 is upgraded with USB-C over the previous standard, Micro-USB. The Libra 2 features a 7-inch E-ink Carta 1200 display with 1680 x 1264 resolution and 300 ppi. It has 32 GB of storage.

==== Kobo Clara 2E ====
The Clara 2E was released in September 2022. It has a 6-inch E-Ink display with 1448 x 1072 resolution and 300 ppi, and the exterior is made with 85% recycled plastics.

=== Chronological overview ===
Legend:	Unsupported	Discontinued	Current

Name	Model	Display				Input	Storage		CPU	RAM	Connectivity	Features / Notes	Dimensions	Weight	Introductory price	Released	Battery
		Type	Size	Resolution	ppi		Internal	Expanded	Make and model		USB +				(US$)		
Kobo eReader	N416	E-ink Vizplex	6"	800x600	170	D-Pad	1 GB	Yes SD 4 GB	Samsung S3C2440AL 400 MHz	96 MiB	USB microB, Bluetooth		184 × 120 × 10 mm	220 g	$199	May 2010	
Kobo WiFi	N289 / N647	E-ink Vizplex	6"	800x600	170	D-Pad	1 GB	Yes SD 32 GB	Freescale i.MX357 533 MHz	128 MiB	USB microB, Wi-Fi bg		184 × 120 × 10 mm	221 g	$199	October 2010	
Kobo Touch	N905[ BC]	E-ink Pearl	6"	800x600	170	Infrared touchscreen	2 GB microSD	Yes microSD 32 GB	Freescale i.MX508 800 MHz	256 MiB	USB microB, Wi-Fi bgn	First touchscreen.	165 × 114 × 10 mm	200 g	$129	May 2011	1200 mAh
Kobo Glo	N613	E-ink Pearl	6"	1024x768	213	Infrared touchscreen	2 GB microSD	Yes microSD 32 GB	Freescale i.MX507 1 GHz	256 MiB	USB microB, Wi-Fi bgn	First illuminated display.	157 x 114 x 10 mm	185 g	$129	September 2012	
Kobo Mini	N705	E-ink Pearl	5"	800x600	200	Infrared touchscreen	2 GB microSD	No	Freescale i.MX507 800 MHz	256 MiB	USB microB, Wi-Fi bgn		133 x 102 x 10 mm	134 g	$79	September 2012	1000 mAh
Kobo Aura HD	N204B	E-ink Pearl	6.8"	1440x1080	265	Infrared touchscreen	4 GB microSD	Yes microSD 32 GB	Freescale i.MX507 1 GHz	512 MiB	USB microB, Wi-Fi bgn		175.7 x 128.3 x 11.7 mm	240 g	$169	April 2013	1500 mAh
Kobo Aura	N514	E-ink Pearl	6"	1024x768	213	Capacitive touchscreen	4 GB	Yes microSD 32 GB	Freescale i.MX507 1 GHz	256 MiB	USB microB, Wi-Fi bgn		150 x 114 x 8.1 mm	174 g	$149	August 2013	1500 mAh
Kobo Aura H_{2}O	N250	E-ink Carta	6.8"	1440x1080	265	Infrared touchscreen	4 GB microSD	Yes microSD 32 GB	Freescale i.MX507 1 GHz	512 MiB	USB microB, Wi-Fi bgn	Waterproofed	179 x 129 x 9.7 mm	233 g	$179	October 2014	1400 mAh
Kobo Glo HD	N437	E-ink Carta	6"	1448x1072	300	Infrared touchscreen	4 GB microSD	No	Freescale SoloLite i.MX 6 1 GHz	512 MiB	USB microB, Wi-Fi bgn	ComfortLight	157 x 114 x 10 mm	180 g	$129	May 2015	
Kobo Touch 2.0	N587	E-ink Pearl	6"	800x600	167	Infrared touchscreen	4 GB	No	Freescale SoloLite i.MX 6 1 GHz	512 MiB	USB microB, Wi-Fi bgn		157 x 115 x 9.2 mm	185g	$61	September 2015	
Kobo Aura Edition 2	N236	E-ink Carta	6"	1024x768	212	Infrared touchscreen	4 GB	No	Freescale SoloLite i.MX 6 1 GHz	256 MiB	USB microB, Wi-Fi bgn		154.5 x 109 x 8.5 mm	180g	$119	September 2016	
Kobo Aura One	N709	E-ink Carta	7.8"	1872x1404	300	Capacitive touchscreen	8 GB	No	Freescale SoloLite i.MX 6 1 GHz	512 MB	USB microB, Wi-Fi bgn	Waterproofed, ComfortLight PRO	195.1 x 138.5 x 6.9 mm	252 g	$230	September 2016	1400 mAh
Kobo Aura H_{2}O Edition 2	N867	E-ink Carta	6.8"	1440x1080	265	Capacitive touchscreen	8 GB	No	Freescale i.MX 6 SLL 1 GHz	512 MB	USB microB, Wi-Fi bgn	Waterproofed, ComfortLight PRO	172 x 129 x 8.9 mm	210g	$180	May 2017	1500 mAh
Kobo Clara HD	N249	E-ink Carta	6"	1448x1072	300	Capacitive touchscreen	8 GB microSD	No	Freescale i.MX 6 SLL 1 GHz	512 MB	USB microB, Wi-Fi bgn	ComfortLight PRO	159.6 x 110 x 8.35 mm	166g	$119.99	June 2018	1500 mAh
Kobo Forma	N782	E-ink Mobius Carta	8"	1920x1440	300	Capacitive touchscreen, buttons	8 GB or 32 GB	No	Freescale i.MX 6 SLL 1 GHz	512 MB	USB microB, Wi-Fi bgn	Waterproofed, ComfortLight PRO, Flexible substrate	160 x 177.7 x 8.5 mm	197g	$249.99	October 2018	1200 mAh
Kobo Libra H_{2}O	N873	E-ink Carta	7"	1680x1264	300	Capacitive touchscreen, buttons	8 GB	No	Freescale i.MX 6 SLL 1 GHz	512 MB	USB microB, Wi-Fi bgn	Waterproofed, ComfortLight PRO	144 x 159 x 5.0 - 7.8 mm	192g	$169.99	September 2019	1200 mAh
Kobo Nia	N306	E-ink Carta	6"	1024x758	212	Capacitive touchscreen	8 GB	No	Freescale i.MX 6 ULL 900MHz	256 MB	USB microB, Wi-Fi bgn	ComfortLight	112.4 x 159.3 x 9.2 mm	172g	$99.99	July 2020	1000 mAh
Kobo Elipsa	N604	E-ink Carta 1200	10.3"	1404x1872	227	Capacitive touchscreen, Pen	32 GB	No	Allwinner B300 Quad Core @ 1.8 GHz	1 GB	USB-C, Wi-Fi ac/b/g/n, Bluetooth (preview)	ComfortLight	193 x 227.5 x 7.6 mm	383g	$399.99	June 2021	2400 mAh
Kobo Libra 2	N418	E-ink Carta 1200	7"	1680x1264	300	Capacitive touchscreen, buttons	32 GB microSD	No	Freescale i.MX6 SLL 1 GHz	512 MB	USB-C, WiFi b/g/n, Bluetooth	Waterproof, ComfortLight Pro, Dark Mode, Audiobooks	144.6 x 161.6 x 9 mm	215g	$179.99	October 2021	1420 mAh
Kobo Sage	N778	E-ink Carta 1200	8"	1920x1440	300	Capacitive touchscreen, buttons, pen compatible	32 GB	No	Allwinner B300 Quad Core @ 1.8 GHz	512 MB	USB-C, WiFi 802.11 ac/b/g/n, Bluetooth	Waterproof, ComfortLight Pro, Dark Mode, Dropbox support, Audiobooks	160.5 x 181.4 x 7.6 mm	240.8g	$259.99	October 2021	1200 mAh
Kobo Clara 2E	N506	E-ink Carta 1200	6"	1448x1072	300	Capacitive touchscreen	16 GB microSD	No	Freescale Solo Lite 1 GHz	512 MB	USB-C, WiFi 802.11 ac/b/g/n, Bluetooth	Waterproof, ComfortLight Pro, Dark Mode, Audiobooks	112.05 x 159.02 x 8.66 mm	171g	$129.99	September 2022	1500 mAh
Kobo Elipsa 2E	N605	E-ink Carta 1200	10.3"	1404x1872	227	Capacitive touchscreen, Pen	32 GB	No	MediaTek MT8113 2x 2 GHz	1 GB	USB-C, WiFi 802.11 ac/b/g/n, Bluetooth	ComfortLight PRO, Dark Mode, Audiobooks	193 x 227 x 7.5 mm	390g	$399.99	Mid 2023	2400 mAh
Kobo Libra Colour	N428	E-Ink Kaleido 3	7"	1680x1264	300 (B/W) 150 (Color)	Capacitive touchscreen, buttons, Pen	32 GB	No	MediaTek MT8113T 2x ARM A53 2 GHz	1 GB	USB-C, WiFi 802.11 ac/b/g/n, Bluetooth	Waterproof, ComfortLight PRO, Dark Mode, Audiobooks	144.6 x 161 x 8.3 mm	199.5g	$219.99	April 2024	2050 mAh
Kobo Clara BW	N365	E-Ink Carta 1300	6"	1448x1072	300	Capacitive touchscreen	16 GB	No	MediaTek MT8113L ARM A53 1 GHz	512 MB	USB-C, WiFi 802.11 ac/b/g/n, Bluetooth	Waterproof, ComfortLight PRO, Dark Mode, Audiobooks	112 x 160 x 9.2 mm	174g	$129.99	April 2024	1500 mAh
Kobo Clara Colour	N367	E-Ink Kaleido 3	6"	1448x1072	300 (B/W) 150 (Color)	Capacitive touchscreen	16 GB	No	MediaTek MT8113T 2x ARM A53 2 GHz	512 MB	USB-C, WiFi 802.11 ac/b/g/n, Bluetooth	Waterproof, ComfortLight PRO, Dark Mode, Audiobooks	112 x 160 x 9.2 mm	174g	$149.99	April 2024	1500 mAh

== Market share ==
=== Global ===
Global e-book readers shipment in 2015
Sellers	Percent
Kobo	13.11%
Amazon	53.30%
PocketBook	9.02%

=== Canada ===
The Kobo e-reading platform was, as of January 2012, the best-selling in Canada. Research firm Ipsos-Reid estimating that Kobo e-readers represented 46% of the Canadian market.

Market share of e-readers in Canada by Ipsos Reid at January 2012
Sellers	Percent
Kobo	46.0%
Amazon	24.0%
Sony	18.0%
Others	12.0%

=== France ===
As of spring 2012, Kobo had 50% of the market share in France.

=== Other countries ===
In August 2013, Kobo was the second largest ebook retailer in Japan; further, Forbes estimated it at 3% of the market share in the United States.

== Selected subsidiaries ==
In October 2012, Kobo Inc. acquired the digital publishing platform Aquafadas to increase the content available on its e-reader devices.

== Software ==
The firmware updates from Kobo are unencrypted and a wide variety of patches can be applied to them to alter the built-in functionality.

A few open source applications can be installed on Kobo eReaders. This includes KoReader. It also includes font options such as OpenDyslexic.

== See also ==
- Comparison of e-book readers
- Comparison of tablet computers
- Amazon Kindle
- Barnes & Noble Nook
- Sony Reader
- Calibre – open source software to manage a digital library with support of conversion between common e-book formats
