= Nook Simple Touch =

2011 Nook e-reader by Barnes & Noble

Nook Simple Touch Glowlight
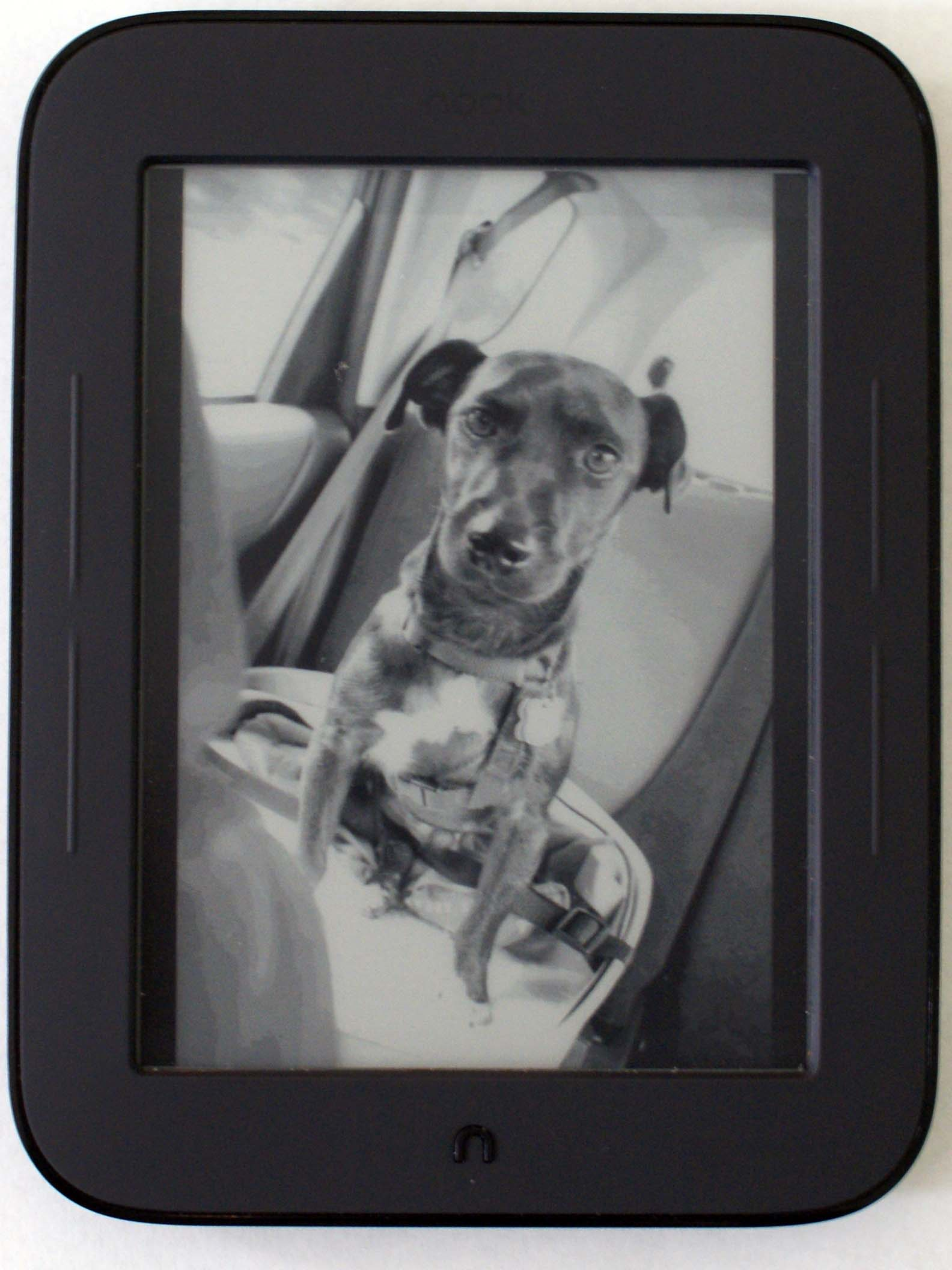
- The Nook Simple Touch displaying a photo screensaver
- Developer: Barnes & Noble
- Manufacturer: Foxconn
- Released: 10 June 2011, Wi-Fi version
- Introductory price: US$139, Wi-Fi version US$99, 2011-11-07
- Operating system: Android 2.1 "Eclair"
- CPU: 800 MHz TI OMAP 3621
- Memory: 256 MB
- Storage: 2 GB internal (1 GB for content, of which 750 MB is reserved for B&N content), microSD expands up to 64 GB
- Display: 6 in (152 mm), 600 × 800 pixel, 167 PPI, E Ink Pearl ED060SCE(LF)C1
- Input: IR matrix Touchscreen, left-right paging buttons, home button
- Connectivity: Wi-Fi 802.11 b/g/n, USB
- Power: 3.7 V, 5.66 Wh (1,530 mAh) lithium-ion polymer battery (2 months with Wi-Fi off)
- Dimensions: 6.5 in (165 mm) H 5.0 in (127 mm) W 0.47 in (12 mm) D
- Weight: 7.48 oz (212 g)
- Website: www.barnesandnoble.com/nook

The Nook Simple Touch (also called the Nook Touch) is the second generation Nook e-reader developed by Barnes & Noble. It features a 600 × 800 pixel E Ink screen with a touchscreen that uses a network of infrared beams slightly above the screen surface. The device also has wireless connectivity via Wi-Fi 802.11 b/g/n and a micro USB port for charging and connecting to a computer.

In April 2012, Barnes & Noble introduced a Simple Touch Reader with "GlowLight" LED technology. On 30 October 2013, Barnes & Noble released the Nook Glowlight, which replaced the Simple Touch with Glowlight. The Simple Touch was still sold until late February 2014, when it was discontinued.

== Reception ==
Since its release on 25 May 2011, the Nook Simple Touch has received generally positive reviews. The summary of a PC Magazine review observed: "Thanks to plenty of upgrades and a laser-sharp focus on the reading experience, the second-gen Barnes & Noble Nook Touch Reader is our new Editors' Choice for ebook readers." Laptop Magazine termed it "the best E Ink eReader on the market right now". An MSNBC critic favored the Nook Simple Touch over the Kindle Touch, citing the Nook's superior user interface and an "over two months" battery life versus the Kindle's "up to two months".

Engadget initially expressed confusion over the device's name and dubbed the device the "Nook Wi-Fi" in its review.

== Use of additional Android applications ==
As an Android device, the Nook Simple Touch can be modified to run Android applications (including those obtained via Google Play) through a process called rooting, which grants users root access to the Nook Simple Touch's file system. Doing so voids the device's warranty in some jurisdictions, although it can often be restored to (non-rooted) factory defaults for warranty claims.

=== Other modifications ===
The Nook Simple Touch is somewhat limited due to the slow processor and the E ink screen. These issues have been overcome via a custom kernel, which overclocks the processor and enables multitouch. The slow refresh rate and flashing screen were overcome by an app called NoRefresh (or Fastmode), which increases refresh rate by reverting to 1-bit depth (black and white, no greyscale).

Another limitation has been the lack of audio. The Nook Simple Touch has no external speakers or headphone ports. This has been overcome with more kernel modifications.

Various custom operating systems (or ROMs) have also been developed, such as the 1337 ROM. These ROMs are similar to the stock OS, but have been modified with several of the tweaks listed above.

== See also ==
- Comparison of e-book readers
- Comparison of tablet computers
