= Flexible display =

Type of computer monitor

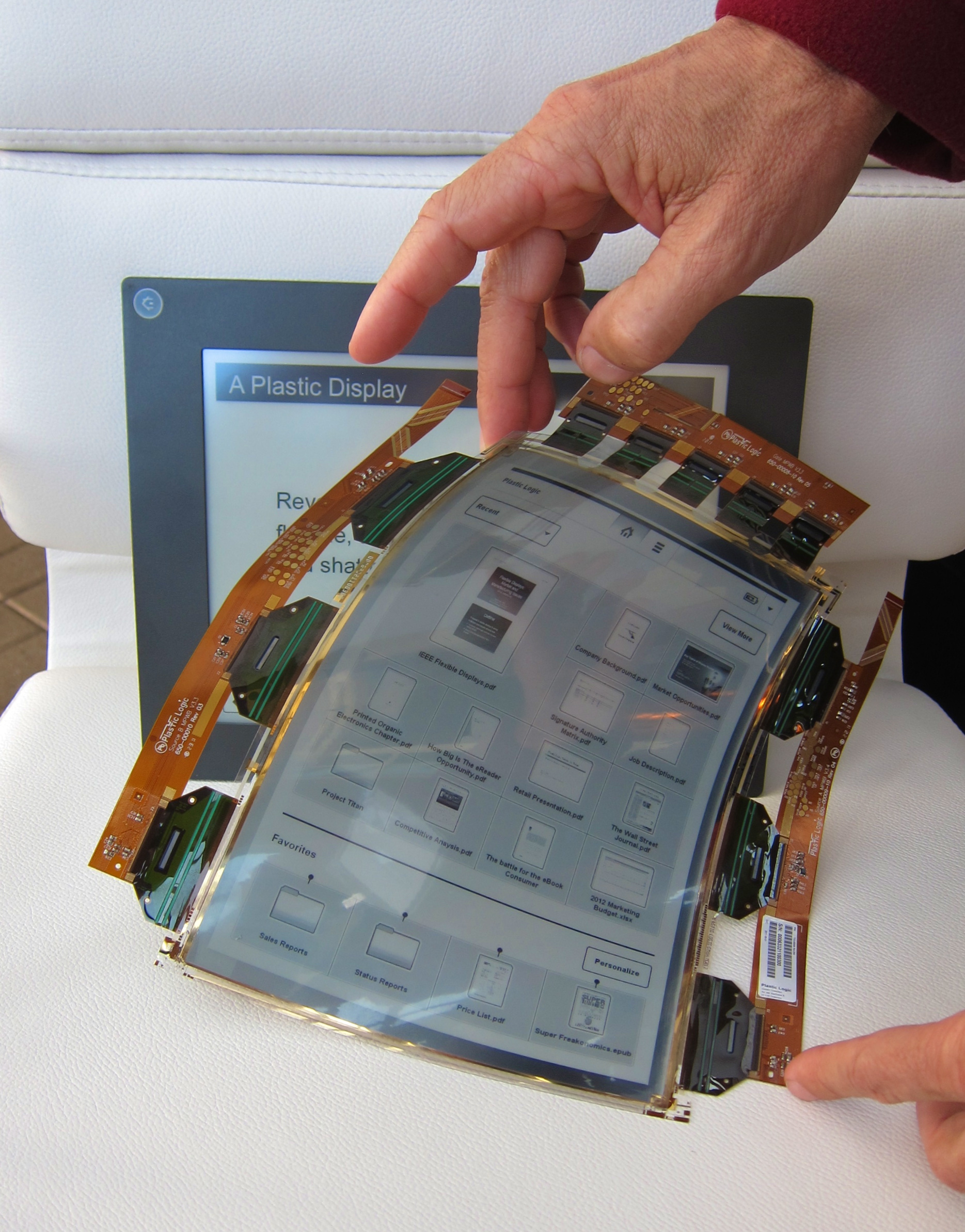
An example of a flexible display, created by Plastic Logic

A flexible display or rollable display is an electronic visual display which is flexible in nature, as opposed to the traditional flat screen displays used in most electronic devices. In recent years there has been a growing interest from numerous consumer electronics manufacturers to apply this display technology in e-readers, mobile phones and other consumer electronics. Such screens can be rolled up like a scroll without the image or text being distorted. Technologies involved in building a rollable display include electronic ink, Gyricon, Organic LCD, and OLED.

Electronic paper displays which can be rolled up have been developed by E Ink. At CES 2006, Philips showed a rollable display prototype, with a screen capable of retaining an image for several months without electricity. In 2007, Philips launched a 5-inch, 320 × 240-pixel rollable display based on E Ink’s electrophoretic technology. Some flexible organic light-emitting diode displays have been demonstrated.The first commercially sold flexible display was an electronic paper wristwatch. A rollable display is an important part of the development of the roll-away computer.

== Applications ==
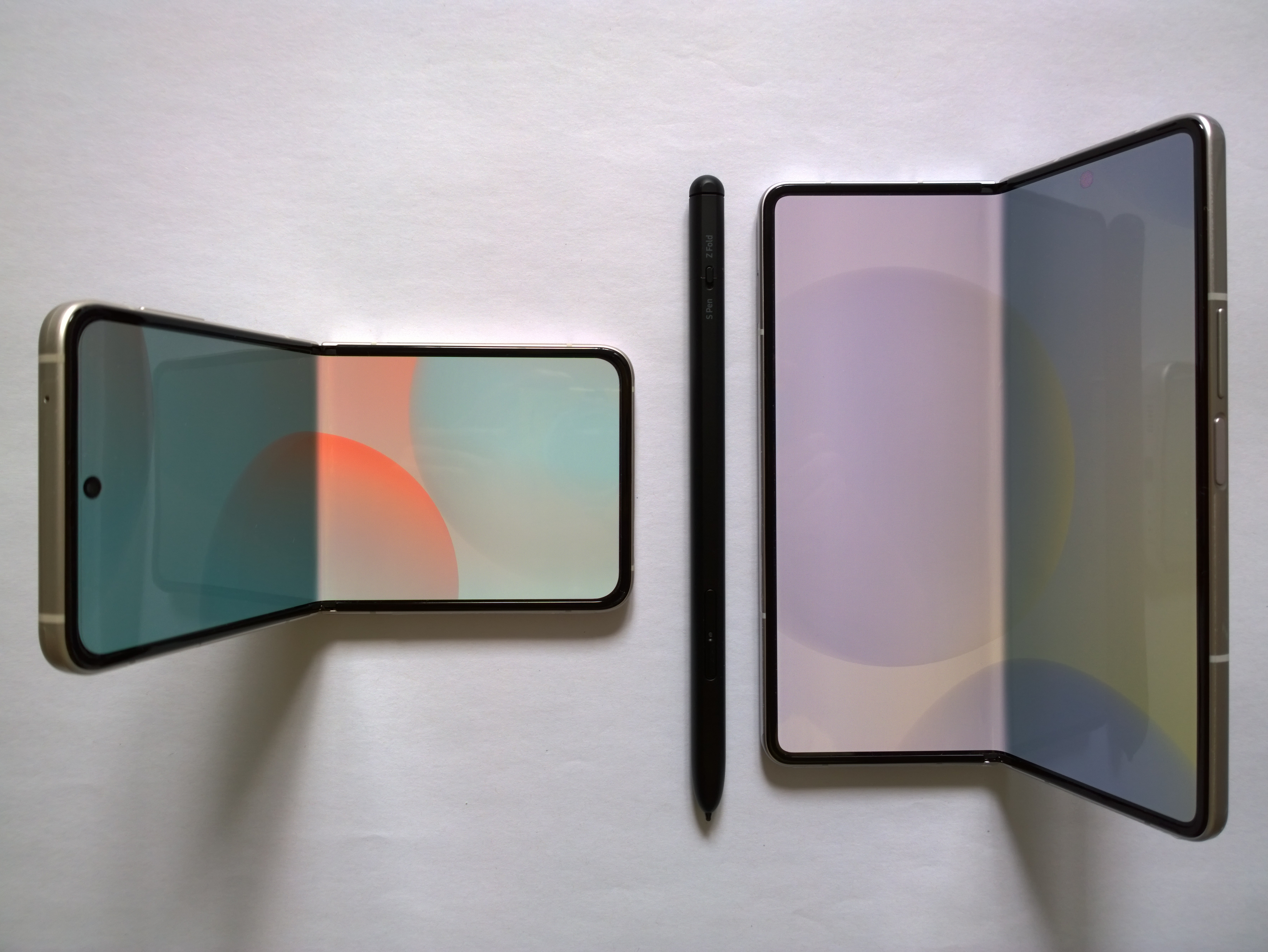
Flexible OLED displays on foldable smartphones

With the flat panel display having already been widely used more than 40 years, there have been many desired changes in the display technology, focusing on developing a lighter, thinner product that was easier to carry and store. Through the development of rollable displays in recent years, scientists and engineers agree that flexible flat panel display technology has huge market potential in the future.

Rollable displays can be used in many places:

- Mobile devices.
- Laptops and PDAs.
- A permanently conformed display that securely fits around the wrists.
- A child's mask for Halloween and other uses.
- An odd-shaped display integrated in a steering wheel or automobile.

== History ==
=== Flexible electronic paper based displays ===
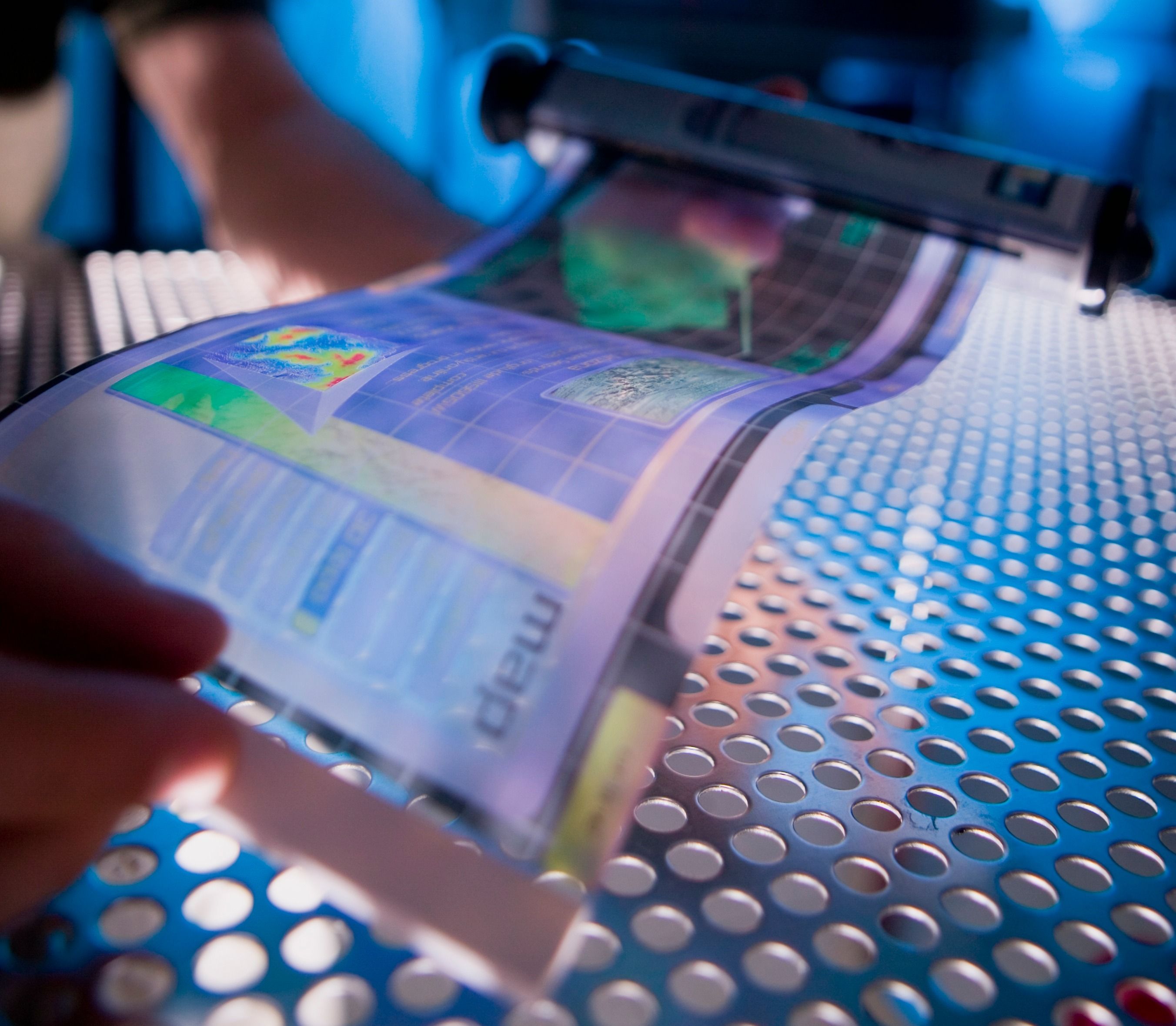
A flexible display

Flexible electronic paper (e-paper) based displays were the first flexible displays conceptualized and prototyped. While the idea for this type of display is not recent and had been attempted by several companies in the past, only recently has mass production of this technology begun for implementation in consumer electronic devices.

==== Xerox PARC ====
The concept of developing a flexible display was first put forth by Xerox PARC (Palo Alto Research Company). In 1974, Nicholas K. Sheridon, a PARC employee, made a major breakthrough in flexible display technology and produced the first flexible e-paper display. Dubbed Gyricon, this new display technology was designed to mimic the properties of paper, but married with the capacity to display dynamic digital images. Sheridon envisioned the advent of paperless offices and sought commercial applications for Gyricon. In 2003 Gyricon LLC was formed as a direct subsidiary of Xerox to commercialize the electronic paper technology developed at Xerox PARC. Gyricon LLC's operations were short lived and in December 2005 Xerox closed the subsidiary company in a move to focus on licensing the technology instead.

==== HP and ASU ====
In 2005, Arizona State University (ASU) opened a 250,000 square foot facility dedicated to flexible display research named the ASU Flexible Display Center (FDC). ASU received $43.7 million from the U.S. Army Research Laboratory (ARL) towards the development of this research facility in February 2004. A planned prototype device was slated for public demonstration later that year. However, the project met a series of delays. In December 2008, ASU in partnership with Hewlett Packard demonstrated a prototype flexible e-paper from the Flexible Display Center at the university. HP continued on with the research, and in 2010, showcased another demonstration. However, due to limitations in technology, HP stated "[our company] doesn't actually see these panels being used in truly flexible or rollable displays, but instead sees them being used to simply make displays thinner and lighter."

Between 2004–2008, ASU developed its first small-scale flexible displays. Between 2008–2012, ARL committed to further sponsorship of ASU’s Flexible Display Center, which included an additional $50 million in research funding. Although the U.S. Army funds ASU’s development of the flexible display, the center’s focus is on commercial applications.

==== Plastic Logic ====
Plastic Logic is a company that develops and manufactures monochrome plastic flexible displays in various sizes based on its proprietary organic thin film transistor (OTFT) technology. They have also demonstrated their ability to produce colour displays with this technology, however they are currently not capable of manufacturing them on a large scale. The displays are manufactured in the company's purpose-built factory in Dresden, Germany, which was the first factory of its kind to be built – dedicated to the high volume manufacture of organic electronics. These flexible displays are cited as being "unbreakable", because they are made completely of plastic and do not contain glass. They are also lighter and thinner than glass-based displays and low-power. Applications of this flexible display technology include signage, wristwatches and wearable devices as well as automotive and mobile devices.

==== Organic User Interfaces and the Human Media Lab ====
In 2004, a team led by Prof. Roel Vertegaal at Queen's University's Human Media Lab in Canada developed PaperWindows, the first prototype bendable paper computer and first Organic User Interface. Since full-colour, US Letter-sized displays were not available at the time, PaperWindows deployed a form of active projection mapping of computer windows on real paper documents that worked together as one computer through 3D tracking. At a lecture to the Gyricon and Human-Computer Interaction teams at Xerox PARC on 4 May 2007, Prof. Vertegaal publicly introduced the term Organic User Interface (OUI) as a means of describing the implications of non-flat display technologies on user interfaces of the future: paper computers, flexible form factors for computing devices, but also encompassing rigid display objects of any shape, with wrap-around, skin-like displays. The lecture was published a year later as part of a special issue on Organic User Interfaces in the Communications of the ACM. In May 2010, the Human Media Lab partnered with ASU's Flexible Display Center to produce PaperPhone, the first flexible smartphone with a flexible e-ink display. PaperPhone used bend gestures for navigating contents. Since then, the Human Media Lab has partnered with Plastic Logic and Intel to introduce the first flexible tablet PC and multi-display e-paper computer, PaperTab, at CES 2013, debuting the world's first actuated flexible smartphone prototype, MorePhone in April 2013.

==== Others ====
Since 2010, Sony Electronics, AU Optronics and LG Electronics have all expressed interest in developing flexible e-paper displays. However, only LG have formally announced plans for mass production of flexible e-paper displays.

=== Flexible OLED-based displays ===
Research and development into flexible OLED displays largely began in the late 2000s with the main intentions of implementing this technology in mobile devices. However, this technology has recently made an appearance, to a moderate extent, in consumer television displays as well.

==== Nokia Morph and Kinetic concepts ====
Nokia first conceptualized the application of flexible OLED displays in mobile phone with the Nokia Morph concept mobile phone. Released to the press in February 2008, the Morph concept was project Nokia had co-developed with the University of Cambridge. With the Morph, Nokia intended to demonstrate their vision of future mobile devices to incorporate flexible and polymorphic designs; allowing the device to seamlessly change and match a variety of needs by the user within various environments. Though the focus of the Morph was to demonstrate the potential of nanotechnology, it pioneered the concept of utilizing a flexible video display in a consumer electronics device. Nokia renewed their interest in flexible mobile devices again in 2011 with the Nokia Kinetic concept. Nokia unveiled the Kinetic flexible phone prototype at Nokia World 2011 in London, alongside Nokia’s new range of Windows Phone 7 devices. The Kinetic proved to be a large departure from the Morph physically, but it still incorporated Nokia's vision of polymorphism in mobile devices.

==== Sony ====
Sony Electronics has expressed interest for research and development towards a flexible display since 2005. In partnership with RIKEN (the Institute of Physical and Chemical Research), Sony promised to commercialize this technology in TVs and cellphones sometime around 2010. In May 2010 Sony showcased a rollable TFT-driven OLED display.

==== Samsung ====
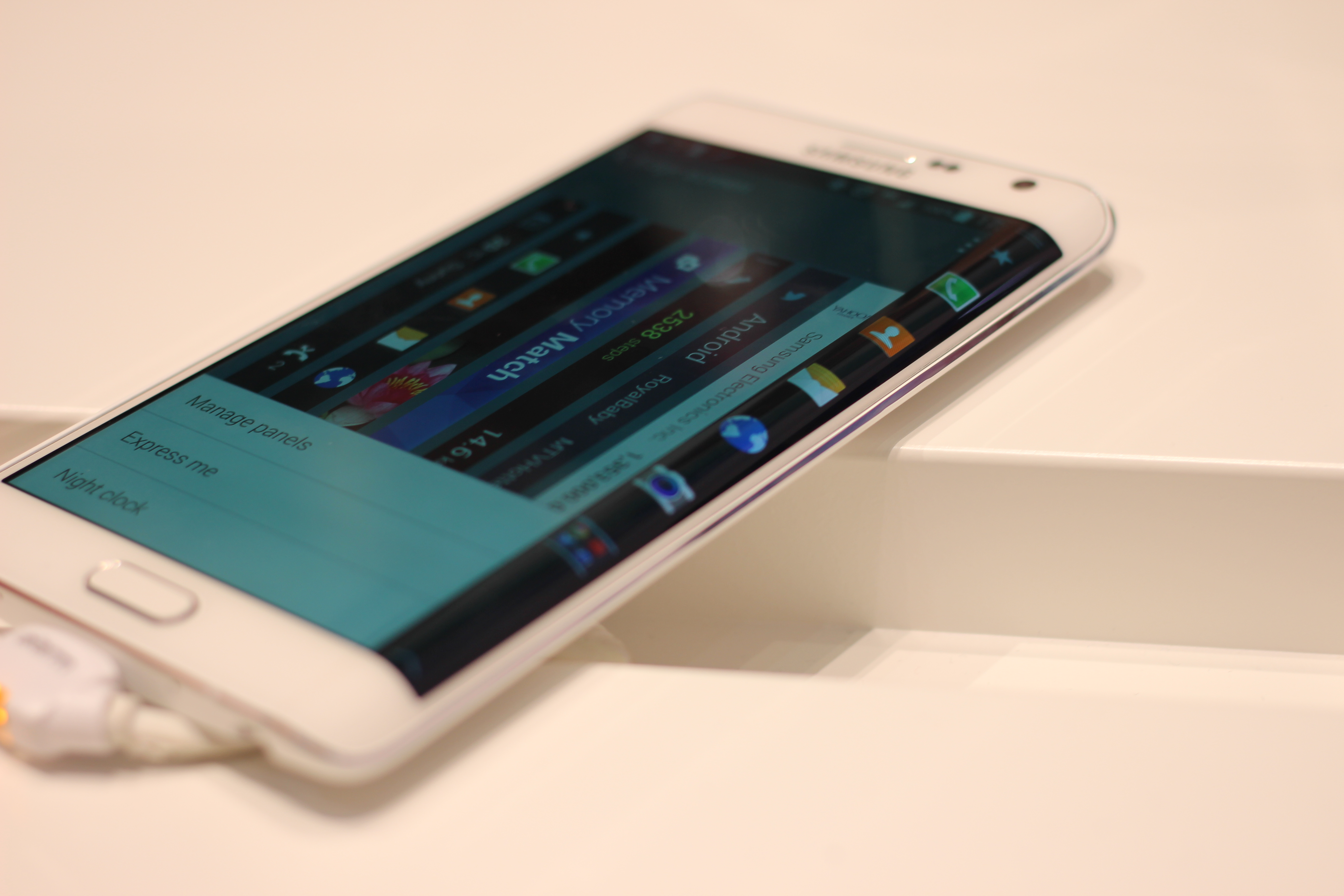
Samsung's Youm concept device was used as a basis for the Galaxy Note Edge.

Foldable smartphones of the Samsung Galaxy Z series

In late 2010, Samsung Electronics announced the development of a prototype 4.5 inch flexible AMOLED display. The prototype device was then showcased at Consumer Electronics Show in 2011. During the 2011 Q3 quarterly earnings call, Samsung’s vice president of investor relations, Robert Yi, confirmed the company’s intentions of applying the technology and releasing products utilizing it by early 2012. In January 2012 Samsung acquired Liquavista, a company with expertise in manufacturing flexible displays, and announced plans to begin mass production by Q2 2012.

In January 2013, Samsung exposed its brand new, unnamed product during the company's keynote address at CES in Las Vegas. Brian Berkeley, the senior vice president of Samsung's display lab in San Jose, California had announced the development of flexible displays. He said "the technology will let the company's partners make bendable, rollable, and foldable displays," and he demonstrated how the new phone can be rollable and flexible during his speech.

During Samsung's CES 2013 keynote presentation, two prototype mobile devices codenamed "Youm" that incorporated the flexible AMOLED display technology were shown to the public. "Youm" has curved display screen, the use of OLED screen giving this phone deeper blacks and a higher overall contrast ratio with better power efficiency than traditional LCD displays. Also this phone has the advantages of a rollable display; it is lighter, thinner, and more durable than LCD displays. Samsung stated that "Youm" panels would be seen in the market in a short time and production would commence in 2013.

Samsung subsequently released the Galaxy Round, a smartphone with an inward curving screen and body, in October 2013. One of the Youm concepts, which featured a curved screen edge used as a secondary area for notifications and shortcuts, was developed into the Galaxy Note Edge released in 2014. In 2015, Samsung applied the technology to its flagship Galaxy S series with the release of the Galaxy S6 Edge, a variant of the S6 model with a screen sloped over both sides of the device. During a developer conference in 2018, Samsung showed a foldable smartphone prototype, which was subsequently revealed in February 2019 as the Galaxy Fold.

==== ASU ====
The Flexible Display Center (FDC) at Arizona State University announced a continued effort in forwarding flexible displays in 2012. On 30 May, in partnership with Army Research Lab scientists, ASU announced that it has successfully manufactured the world's largest flexible OLED display using thin-film transistor (TFTs) technology. ASU intends the display to be used in "thin, lightweight, bendable and highly rugged devices."

==== Xiaomi ====
In January 2019, Chinese manufacturer Xiaomi showed a foldable smartphone prototype. CEO Lin Bin of Xiaomi demoed the device in a video on the Weibo social network. The device features a large foldable display that curves 180 degrees inwards on two sides. The tablet turns into a smartphone, with a screen diagonal of 4.5", adjusting the user interface on the fly.

== Advantages ==
Flexible displays have many advantages over non-bendable displays: having better durability, lighter weight, a thinner form, and can be perfectly curved and used in many devices. Moreover, the major difference between a non-bendable display and a rollable display is that the display area of a rollable display can be bigger than the device itself; If a flexible device measuring, for example, 5 inches in diagonal and a roll of 7.5mm, it can be stored in a device smaller than the screen itself and close to 15mm in thickness.

== Technical details ==
=== Electronic paper ===
Flexible displays that use electronic paper technology commonly use Electrophoretic or Electrowetting technologies. However, each type of flexible electronic paper varies in specification due to different implementation techniques by different companies.

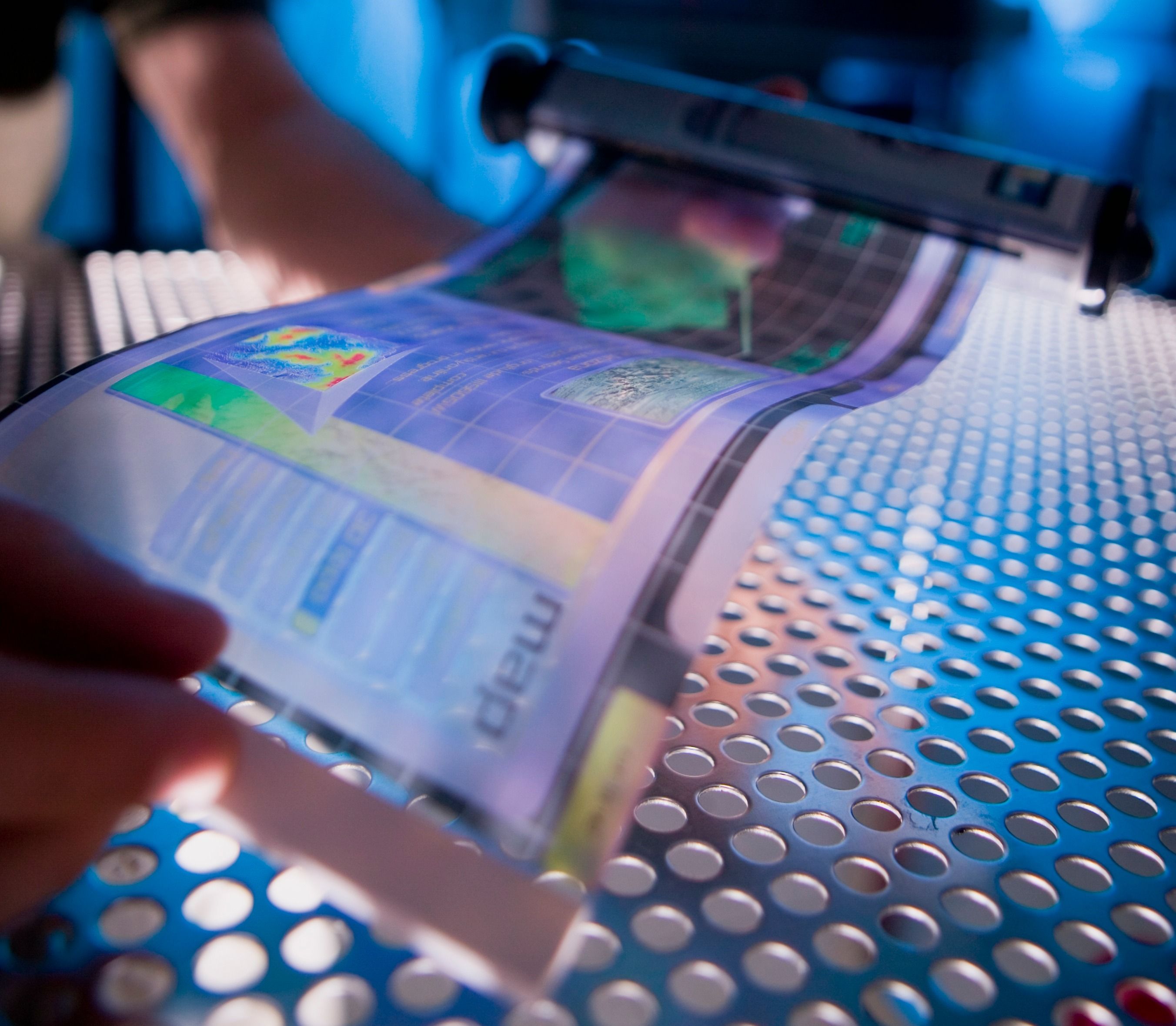
Arizona State University and HP's flexible display demonstrated in 2008 at the university's Flexible Display Center

==== HP and ASU e-paper ====
The flexible electronic paper display technology co-developed by Arizona State University and HP employs a manufacturing process developed by HP Labs called Self-Aligned Imprint Lithography (SAIL). The screens are made by layering stacks of semi-conductor materials and metals between pliable plastic sheets. The stacks need to be perfectly aligned and stay that way. Alignment proves difficult during manufacturing when heat during manufacturing can deform the materials and when the resulting screen also needs to remain flexible. The SAIL process gets around this by ‘printing’ the semiconductor pattern on a fully composed substrate, so that the layers always remain in perfect alignment. The limitation of the material the screen is based on allows only a finite amount of full rolls, hence limiting its commercial application as a flexible display. Specifications provided regarding the prototype display are as follows:

- flexible and rollable up to "about half a dozen times"
- "unbreakable"

==== AUO e-paper ====
The flexible electronic paper display announced by AUO is unique as it is the only solar powered variant. A separate rechargeable battery is also attached when solar charging is unavailable. Specifications

- 6-inch diagonal display size
- radius of curvature can reach 100mm
- 9:1 high contrast ratio
- reflectance of 33%
- 16 gray levels
- solar powered
- "unbreakable"

==== LG e-paper ====
Specifications:

- 6-inch diagonal display size
- 1024x768 (XGA) resolution
- 4:3 aspect ratio
- TFT based electronic display
- "allows bending at a range of 40 degrees from the center of the screen"
- 0.7mm thickness from the side
- 14g weight
- can drop from 1.5m above ground with no resultant damage
- "unbreakable" (from tests with a small urethane hammer)

==== List of displays by their reported curvature ====
| Model | Diagonal (in) | Radius of curvature* | Curved along its wider / shorter side? |
|---|---|---|---|
| Samsung Round | 5.7 | 400 millimetres (16 in) | shorter |
| LG G Flex | 6 | 700 millimetres (28 in) | wider |
| Samsung KN55S9C | 54.6 | 4,500 millimetres (180 in) | wider |
| LG 55EA9800 | 54.6 | 5,000 millimetres (200 in) | wider |

*Lower is more sharply curved

=== OLED ===
Many of the e-paper based flexible displays are based on OLED technology and its variants. Though this technology is relatively new in comparison with e-paper based flexible displays, implementation of OLED flexible displays saw considerable growth in the last few years.

==== ASU ====
Specifications:

- 6-inch diagonal display size
- 480x360 4k resolution
- 4:3 aspect ratio
- OLED display technology with a TFT back plane

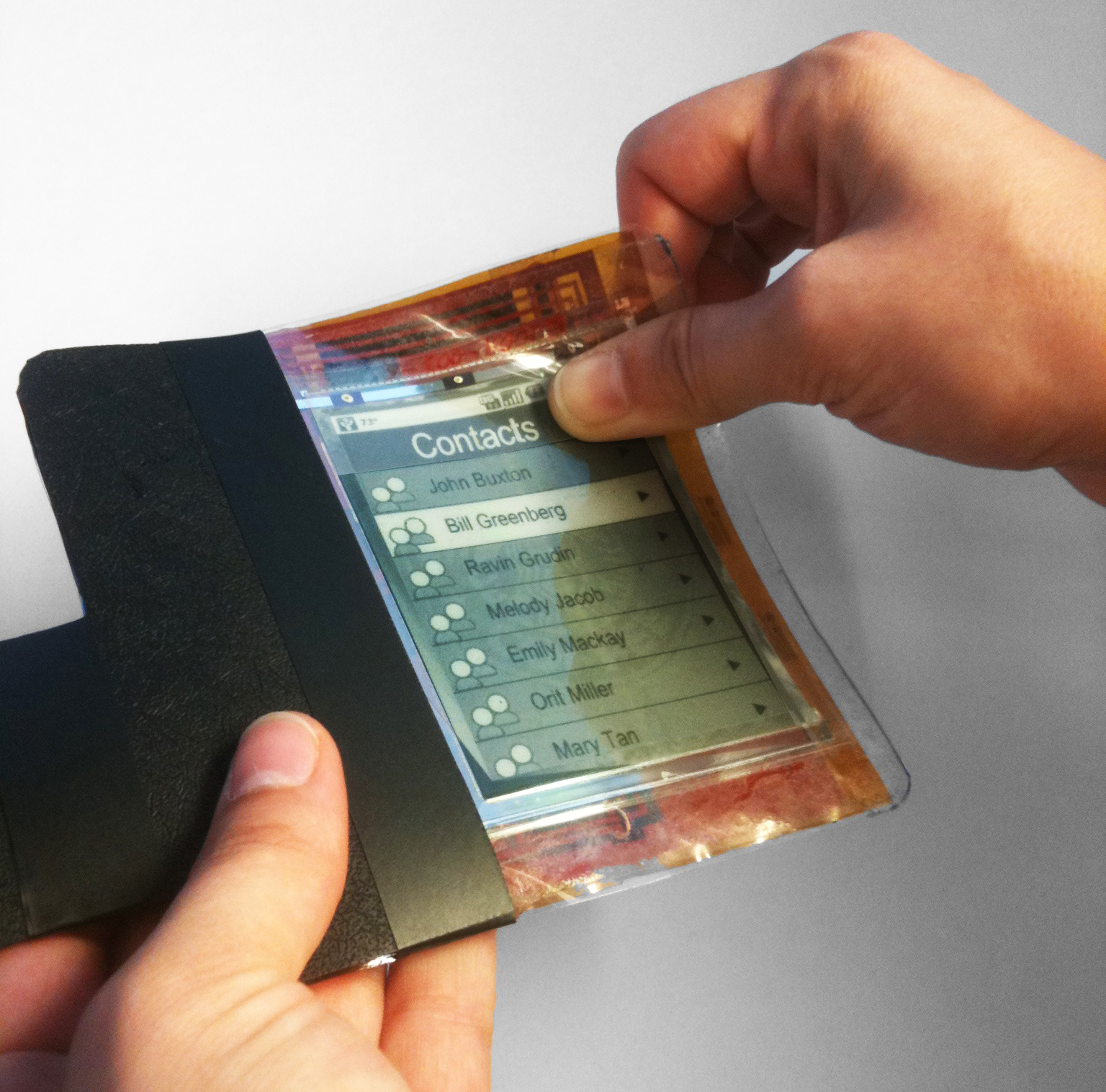
PaperPhone (2011) by Human Media Lab and ASU was the first flexible smartphone prototype.

==== Samsung ====
Specifications:

- 4.5-inch diagonal display size
- 800x480 WVGA, 1280x720 WXGA and WQXGA (2560×1600) resolutions
- AMOLED display technology
- "unbreakable"

== Concept devices ==
=== Mobile devices ===
In May 2011, Human Media Lab at Queen's University in Canada introduced PaperPhone, the first flexible smartphone, in partnership with the Arizona State University Flexible Display Center. PaperPhone used 5 bend sensors to implement navigation of the user interface through bend gestures of corners and sides of the display. In January 2013, the Human Media Lab introduced the first flexible tablet PC, PaperTab, in collaboration with Plastic Logic and Intel Labs, at CES. PaperTab is a multi-display environment in which each display represents a window, app or computer document. Displays are tracked in 3D to allow multidisplay operations, such as collate to enlarge the display space, or pointing with one display onto another to pull open a document file. In April 2013 in Paris, the Human Media Lab, in collaboration with Plastic Logic, unveiled the world's first actuated flexible smartphone prototype, MorePhone. MorePhone actuates its body to notify users upon receiving a phone call or message.

Nokia introduced the Kinetic concept phone at Nokia World 2011 in London. The flexible OLED display allows users to interact with the phone by twisting, bending, squeezing and folding in different manners across both the vertical and horizontal planes. The technology journalist website Engadget described interactions such as "[when] bend the screen towards yourself, [the device] acts as a selection function, or zooms in on any pictures you're viewing." Nokia envisioned this type of device to be available to consumers in "as little as three years", and claimed to already possess "the technology to produce it."

At CES 2013, Samsung showcased the two handsets which incorporates AMOLED flexible display technology during its keynote presentation, the Youm and an unnamed Windows Phone 8 prototype device. The Youm possessed a static implementation of flexible AMOLED display technology, as its screen has a set curvature along one of its edges. The benefit of the curvature allows users "to read text messages, stock tickers, and other notifications from the side of the device even if [the user] have a case covering the screen." The unnamed Windows Phone 8 prototype device was composed of a solid base from that extends a flexible AMOLED display. The AMOLED display itself bends and was described as "virtually unbreakable even when dropped" according to Samsung representatives. Brian Berkeley, the senior vice president of Samsung Display, believes that this flexible form factor "will really begin to change how people interact with their devices, opening up new lifestyle possibilities ... [and] allow our partners to create a whole new ecosystem of devices." The Youm's form factor was ultimately utilized on the Galaxy Note Edge, and future Samsung Galaxy S series devices.

ReFlex is a flexible smartphone created by Queen's University’s Human Media Lab.

=== Curved OLED TVs ===
LG Electronics and Samsung Electronics both introduced curved OLED televisions with a curved display at CES 2013 hours apart from each other. Both companies recognized their respective curved OLED prototype television as a first-of-its-kind due to its flexed OLED display. The technology journalist website The Verge noted the subtle curve on 55" Samsung OLED TV allowed it to have a "more panoramic, more immersive viewing experience, and actually improves viewing angles from the side." The experience was also shared viewing the curved 55" LG OLED TV. The LG set is also 3D capable, in addition to the curvature.

| Model | Diagonal (in) | Radius of curvature (mm)* |
|---|---|---|
| Samsung KN55S9C | 54.6 | 4,500 |
| LG 55EA9800 | 54.6 | 5,000 |

*Lower is more sharply curved

== See also ==
- Dual-touchscreen
- Organic user interface (OUI), the category of user interfaces commonly implemented on consumer devices with flexible displays.
- Flexible glass
- Fish scale
- Modular design
- Smart watch
- MSG Sphere
- Evans & Sutherland
