= Attention management =

Study of directing and maintaining human attention

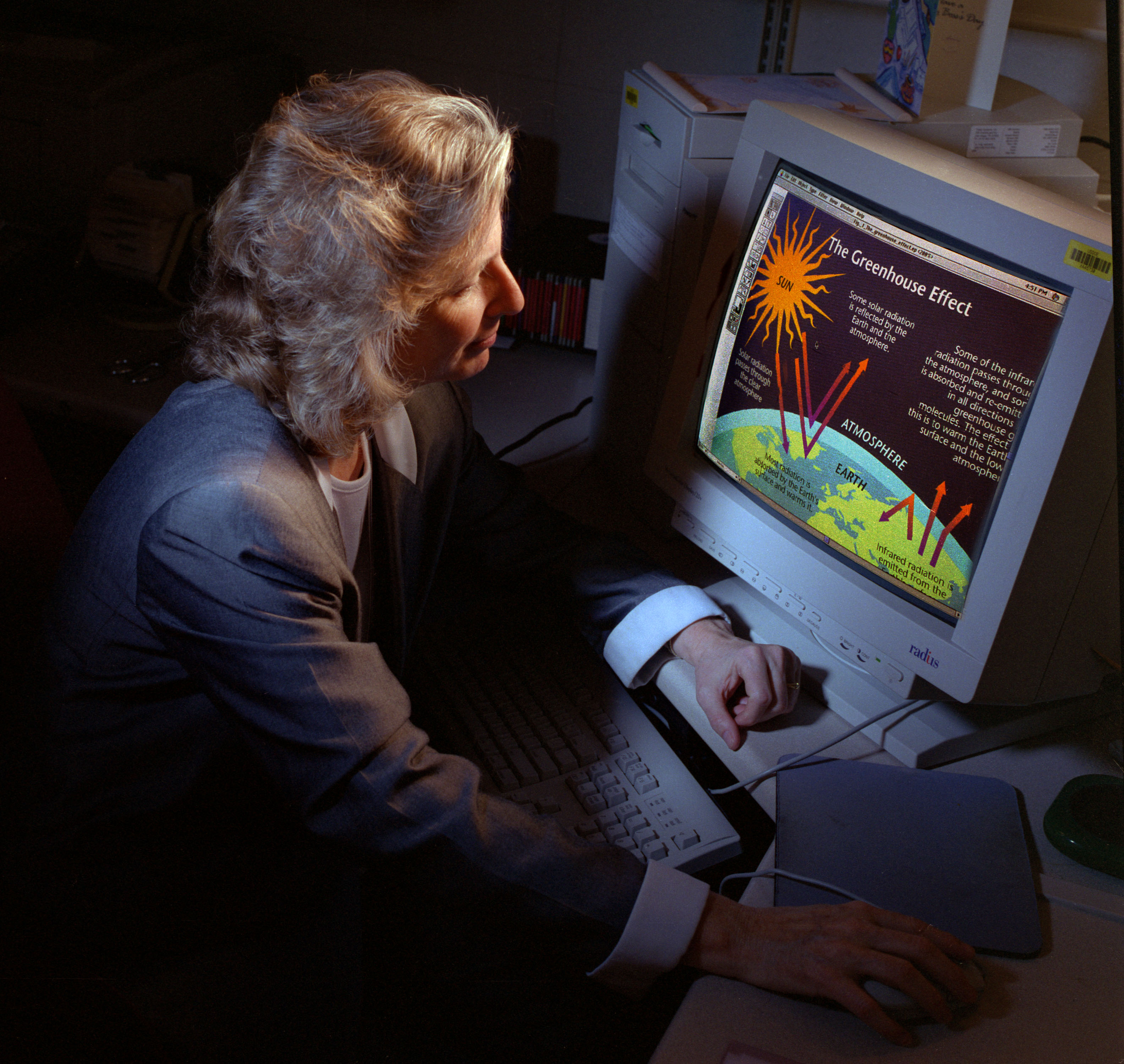
A person's attention focused on a computer screen.

Attention management refers to models and tools for supporting the management of attention at the individual or at the collective level (cf. attention economy), and at the short-term (quasi real time) or at a longer term (over periods of weeks or months).

The ability to control distractions and stay focused is essential to produce higher quality results. A research conducted by Stanford shows that single-tasking is more effective and productive than multi-tasking. Different studies have been conducted in using Information and Communications Technology (ICT) for supporting attention, and in particular, models have been elaborated for supporting attention.

== Background ==
The scarcity of attention is the underlying assumption for attention management; the researcher Herbert A. Simon pointed out that when there is a vast availability of information, attention becomes the more scarce resource as human beings cannot digest all the information.

Fundamentally, attention is limited by the processing power of the brain. Applying information theory, estimates from Hungarian-American psychologist Mihaly Csikszentmihalyi and engineer Robert Lucky expect the processing capacity of the human conscious mind to be around 120 bits per second; listening to a person speak requires about 60 bits per second of processing; this implies you can barely comprehend two people speaking at the same time. According to German physiologist Manfred Zimmermann, the human sensory system can pick up information at a much higher rate: he estimates a channel capacity of 10 million bits/s for the eyes alone, 1 million bits/s for the skin, and 100,000 bits/s for the aural channel while conscious perception can cover only a small fraction of this. Consequently, the brain needs to employ mental filters to determine the most important information needing to be processed. Most of these filtering processes happen automatically and beyond conscious awareness. Limitations of attention capacities are revealed in many contexts, for example when speaking on a telephone while driving. The resulting high-frequency switching between processing of visual and auditory input is proven to constrict recognition of important information; driver's reactions to cars braking in front of them are affected, so is recollection of roadside billboards.

Attention is also limited by the resources available to the neurons in the brain that enable humans to maintain focus as all processed information contributes to mental fatigue. Estimates suggest that the daily information input of an American in 2011 was five times as high as that in 1986. Therefore, according to Maura Thomas, attention management is the most important skill for the 21st century. With digital revolution and the advent of internet and communication devices, time management is no longer enough to guarantee a good quality of work. Allocating time to perform one activity does not mean that it will receive attention if constant interruptions and distractions come across. Therefore, people should stop worrying about time management and focus on attention management.

Beside the implications on work and productivity, attention management can also be applied with regard to other areas such as happiness. British behavioral scientist Paul Dolan identifies the allocation of attention as a key component in improving personal well-being. Life events only affect the individual to the extent he or she is attending to it; illnesses are perceived as worse if they are more salient and repeatedly expose a person to new negative stimuli. Consequently, managing attention and focusing on things that make the individual happy is one of Dolan's approaches towards greater happiness.

== Attention problems ==
Supporting the management of attention the objective is to bring a certain number of solutions to attention problems. A selection of these problems are:

- people perception cognitive limitations - Such as the limited capacity of the human short-term memory (an average number of 4 items can be managed at a given time), or the theoretical cognitive limit to the number of people with whom one can maintain stable social relationships (the Dunbar's number of 150).
- information overload - The process of taking in too much information in ways that inhibit decision making.
- social interaction overload - (that may for instance originate from the online social networking services from which people get a lot of solicitations)
- interruption - This takes a significant toll on attention. According to Tabboush, people who are interrupted or distracted by chronic pain do significantly worse on attention tasks.
- multitasking - Multitasking is a very important subject to attention and there seems to be conflicting evidence on both sides of the argument. These arguments go back and forth because there are many variables involved with multitasking. In some instances, multitasking two activities such as walking and breathing are second nature, and if someone has had practice performing several tasks simultaneously, multitasking would also increase productivity. However, a meta-analysis has been performed by Caid, Johnston, Willness, Asbridge, and Steel indicating that multitasking texting and driving results in poorer attention.
- attention residue (context switching) – An individual needs to completely abandon a task in order to fully focus on a secondary task. However, humans experience difficulties switching and moving their attention between multiple activities

== Applications ==
=== Distracting from pain ===
Attention management can play a key role in helping people manage pain by focusing their attention elsewhere while experiencing acute pain. However, this must be done strategically, as the most important factor in being a good distractor seems to be that the activity is engaging and interesting for an individual. This changes on a case-by-case basis and must be tailored to the patient. For example, if a person routinely struggles with reading and it routinely disinterests them, giving that person a book would not be a good distractor for when they are suffering from pain. According to a study by Jameson, Trevena, and Swain, participants who were subjected to pain by submerging one of their hands into ice-cold water were able to deal with the pain longer, reported less pain, and less anxiety when they were playing video games than if they were watching television or doing nothing. This study helps the assertion that participating in something engaging and interesting will help to distract from a painful or uncomfortable stimulus.

=== Mindfulness training ===
Mindfulness training can be helpful in attention management. Made famous in the 1970s by Professor Jon Kabat-Zinn's Mindfulness-based stress reduction. Mindfulness-based stress reduction is an intense program of training to help students understand and regulate emotions and patterns of behavior. This kind of training is helpful for people to be more aware of what they are focusing on. According to a study by Jensen, Vangkilde, Frokjaer, and Hasselbalch, mindfulness training is much more effective at reducing stress than nonmindfulness training, i.e. relaxation training. The study also found that those who had participated in mindfulness-training tended to perform better at attentional tasks. Thus, mindfulness training may have a positive effect on attention management.

== Strategies ==
Tools can be designed for supporting attention

- at the organizational level, by supporting organization processes.
- at the collective level
- at the individual level, for instance using attentive user interfaces.
- at the individual level by helping people to assess and analyze their attention related practices (for instance with the tool AttentionScape).

These tools are often adaptive hypermedia, and often rely on profiling the user in order determine how to better support people's attention.

Research distinguishes between autonomous reactions to sensory stimuli (stimulus-driven) and deliberate direction of attention (goal-driven). Correspondingly, attention management can focus on the alteration of external and internal factors.

=== External factors ===
Attention management strategies commonly include the minimization of interruptions as a variety of evidence suggests that eliminating distractions increases productivity. For example, a series of studies has demonstrated that productivity at the workplace is generally higher on days with bad weather due to the absence of distracting thoughts about outdoor activities experienced in good weather. Diverted attention can result in reduced performance and stress; research has shown that interruption can cause higher completion time, double task error rate as well as increase the annoyance of the individual. Interruptions are also proven to contribute to higher anxiety.

Notifications from electronic devices are some of the most common external stimuli causing distraction and studies indicate that social pressure frequently leads to immediate handling of these interruptions. Thus, attention management is considered a field of rising importance in ubiquitous computing and application design. Digital attention management systems utilizing machine learning recognize phases in which interruptions are counterproductive for the user and delay notifications.

Besides utilizing digital systems, strategies minimizing interruptions and irrelevant information can also incorporate human resources in form of secretaries, consultants and other assisting employees; this is common practice observable in higher executive levels of companies and in politics.

=== Internal factors ===
A goal of attention management is to reach the highest level of unobstructed attention and focus, at state widely referred to as flow. The term, coined by Mihaly Csikszentmihalyi, describes a state of full involvement in a task, essentially a level of absorption where the individual forgets about everything but the current activity, even their own existence; all conscious processing capacity is devoted to the task. Characteristic for that state is the underlying intrinsic motivation; staying focused seemingly does not require any additional energy and one experiences motivation to pursue the activity purely for the sake of the activity itself.

Correspondingly, psychologist Adam Grant views inducing motivation as an integral part of attention management. In his eyes, focus on the essential information can be supported by finding the underlying motivation and discovering fascination and meaning in the task at hand.

== Projects ==
A certain number of projects have been conducted to investigate how to use ICT to support attention such as:

- AtGentive – Attentive Agents for Collaborative Learners.
- SAKE – Semantic-enabled Agile Knowledge-based eGovernment (IST 027128)
- SUITOR

== See also ==
- Attention economy
- Information overload
- Personal information management
- Time management
- User modeling
- Ambient awareness
- Situation awareness
- Body doubling
