= Paul Dolan =

Paul Dolan may refer to:

- Paul Dolan (behavioural scientist) (born 1968), professor and chair at the London School of Economics
- Paul Dolan (athlete) (1927–?), Irish Olympic sprinter
- Paul Dolan (baseball) (born 1958), chairman/CEO of the Cleveland Indians of Major League Baseball
- Paul Dolan (soccer) (born 1966), former member of men's national soccer team in Canada
