= Roll-away computer =

Theoretical device

A roll-away computer is an idea introduced as part of a series by Toshiba in 2000, which aimed to predict the trends in personal computing five years into the future. Since its announcement, the roll-away computer has remained a theoretical device.

A roll-away computer is a computer with a flexible polymer-based display technology, measuring 1 mm thick and weighing around 200 grams.

Flexible and rollable displays started entering the market in 2006 (see electronic paper).

The R&D department of Seiko Epson has demonstrated a flexible active-matrix LCD panel (including the pixel thin film transistors and the peripheral TFT drivers), a flexible active-matrix OLED panel, the world's first flexible 8-bit asynchronous CPU (ACT11)—which uses the world's first flexible SRAM.

University of Tokyo researchers have demonstrated flexible flash memory.

LG Corporation has demonstrated an 18-inch high-definition video display panel that can roll up into a 3 cm diameter tube.

== See also ==
- Tablet PC
- Roll-up keyboard
- Folding smartphone
