= Motorola Fone F3 =

Mobile phone

Motorola F3

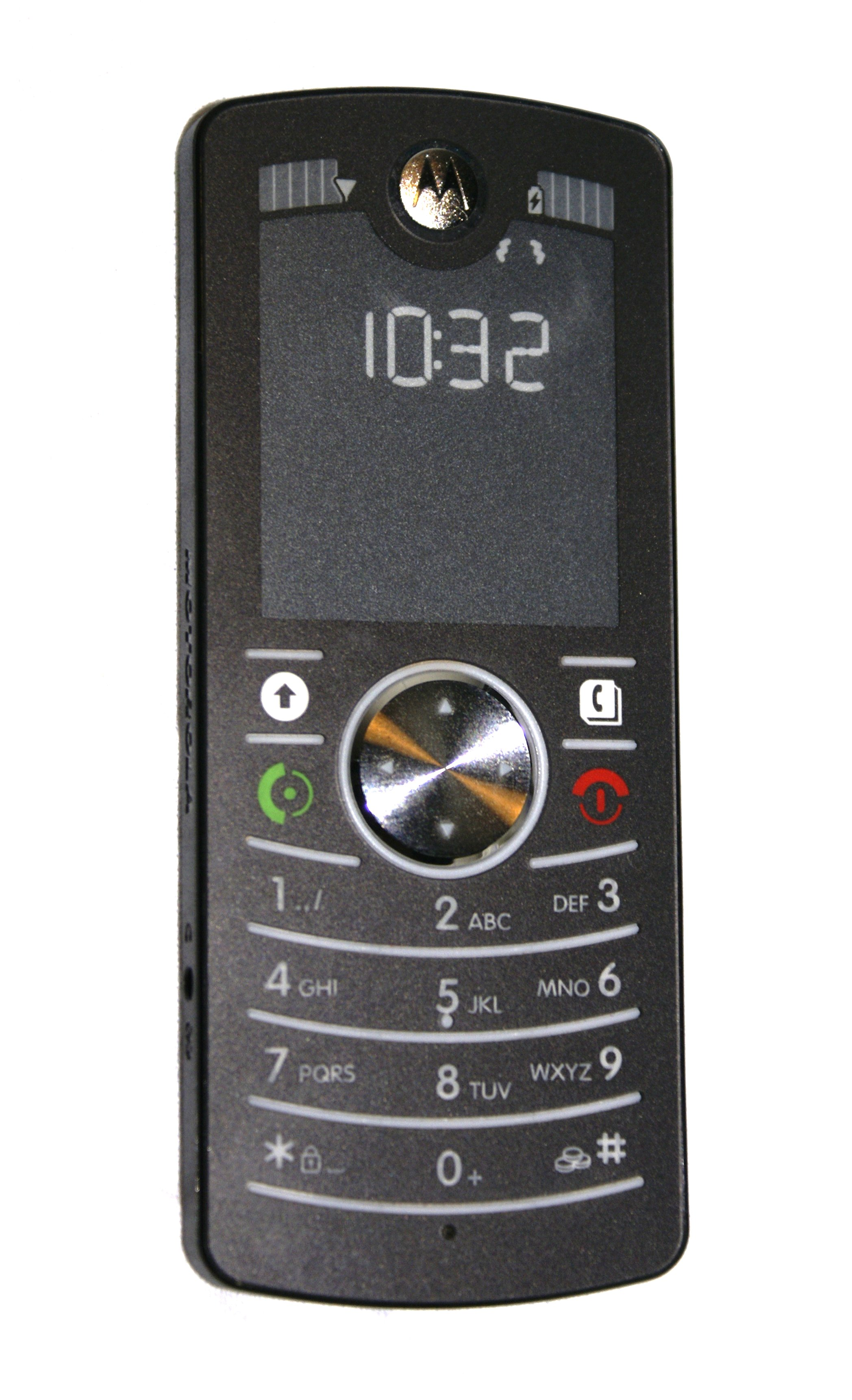
- Compatible networks: GSM / CDMA
- Dimensions: 47×114×9.1 mm (1.85×4.49×0.36 in)
- Weight: 68 g (2 oz)
- Display: electronic paper (ClearVision Display)

The Motorola F3, also marketed as the Motofone (styled MOTOFONE), is a candybar style GSM mobile phone from Motorola, released on 28 November 2006. A CDMA variant was released, F3c. It was the first mobile phone to use an electronic paper display.

The Motofone F3 was designed to appeal to the low-end market and developing countries, and was thus less functional, but also less expensive than most phones. Motorola made it appealing to developing markets and people with reading and visual difficulties by using only simple symbols and using speech synthesis to identify tasks in the menu.

== Features ==
=== Display technology ===
The F3 was the first mobile phone to use electronic paper in its screen. Motorola used the term ClearVision to describe the new display, which was manufactured using E Ink's electrophoretic imaging film. The electronic paper main display allowed for the phone's thinness (no glass), longer battery life, and outdoor viewability (paper-like reflectivity). It had a backlight for the keypad and a slit that projects the backlight onto the screen so the display can be seen in darkness.

The characteristics of the display were fairly restrictive. The text display contained only two lines of six characters each, making the use of text messaging (SMS) and data services less practical than on standard LCD displays. The display used a fixed 'digital clock' style font, with no functionality for changing between upper case and lower case text. All SMSs sent by the F3 were received entirely in lower case, and each character of any SMS received by the F3 is displayed in whichever case made the most sense using the font. Also, the non-alphabetic characters were severely limited due to this display, as the phone could only provide support for the following characters:

- Comma (,) (periods . in incoming text messages are displayed as commas)
- Hyphen (-)
- Question mark (?)
- At-sign (@)
- Asterisk (*)
- (+), to write this character, hold down the 0 key

No other non-alphanumeric characters could be entered, and on receiving an SMS any non-alphabetic character not listed above was displayed as a hyphen.

Although the display could be restrictive when it came to text applications, the display was very energy efficient and conducive to extremely long battery life.

=== User interface ===
Since the F3 had only two lines of fixed icons on the top and bottom of the display, as well as one line of six 14-segment characters and another line of six 7-segment numbers available on its display, the user interface was very different from the usual menu structure normally found on mobile phones. The only thing resembling a (flat) menu was accessed by pressing left/right on the central button: It allowed writing an SMS, reading a saved SMS, call history, choosing the ringtone (out of seven melodies), setting date and time, and setting the alarm clock. The menu was visualized by fixed icons in the bottom row, following the left/right pattern of the navigation button.

The F3 had a few dedicated buttons for opening the address book (top right), canceling any action (the red button), dialing the currently displayed number (the green button) and an "action" button (top left). A few more functions were available by shortcuts: When making a call, pressing the action button twice switched the loudspeaker on/off, while pressing up/down controls the speaker volume. The same button used in standby toggled voice prompts, while pressing up/down controls ringtone volume. When the phone rung, due to incoming calls, the ringer could also be silenced by pressing up/down. All activated features (set alarm clock, activated vibration mode, roaming, ...) were indicated by simple icons in fixed positions in the top row, and every successful action acknowledged by an "OK" icon flashing on and off a few times. The only context-sensitive button was the action button which was used for "OK" on options as well as choosing a number or address book entry when writing an SMS or for answering a received SMS.

Reception strength (left) and battery status (right) were constantly displayed in two prominent strips above the actual display. Both were readable in any light condition and from considerable distances.

=== Special features ===
The F3 Motofone was designed for usage in developing countries and sported a display which coped well with both bright sunlight and very dim light. Voice prompts also explained the current function in a choice of languages, depending on region; a unit bought in Germany offered German, English and Italian. It was also fairly solid and rugged and could survive not only rough handling but also very dusty and/or damp conditions well, as the case had only two openings (a charger/headset jack and the battery cover) as well as a totally sealed keyboard. There are even videos on the Internet showing the F3 being thrown from a 3-story building into tarmac, and being run over by a car on a gravel surface. The phone survived intact.

The charger/headset jack for the F3 Motofone (and variants) was not a standard 2.5 mm or 3.5 mm headset port. It was a DC connector that can support mono sound quality. This is not well documented at Motorola, and internal documentation indicates the jack is a standard 2.5 mm TRS connector jack. The jack shown on the Motorola site clearly has a pin in the center of the jack, prohibiting use of a standard 2.5 mm plug. A mono headset was available as part number CFLN6103AA and the name of it is Motorola S215 Pedestrian Kit. This is a headset only and not an adapter.

The F3 had two internal antennas to maximize reception even when partially shielded by a hand or other obstacles, and a loud maximum volume for ringtones and loudspeaker to facilitate usage in crowded city environments or public transport. The unique default ringing mode vibrates silently for several seconds, then rings at modest volume, then with full volume. A vibrate-only mode and modes with fixed volume can also be set. To ease repairs or recycling, it can be opened by four Torx screws on the back.

== Variants ==
The Motorola Motofone came in two two-band variants: The F3 900/1800 MHz GSM for Europe and much of the rest of the world except the Americas; and the F3 u2 850/1900 MHz GSM for North America and a limited number of Central and South American countries. See GSM frequency bands for specific country coverage.

Both variants came in four different front cover colors: black, blue, red and a silverish grey.

According to its very low price (starting from 20 to €30 /$) the F3/F3c was mainly sold with prepaid (pay-as-you-go) SIM cards and it seems that the sellers often (but not always) implemented a SIM-lock. However, for slightly more (starting at ca. €30) it could also be bought without SIM-lock or card, giving full freedom to choose any provider.

In Brazil, this phone (without SIM-lock) was sold for R$99.00 as of February 2008 (approx. USD 57.00). The SIM-locked version could be purchased for R$29.00 (in telephone carrier stores). The F3 was at the time Brazil's cheapest cellphone.

In Hungary it could be purchased in Dec/2007 for a total of HUF 2000 (approx. USD 11.58 (~€7.87) at that time), with the price already including a prepaid card from T-Mobile with a balance of HUF 600 (approx. USD 3.46 (~€2.35) at that time). Prices for mobile-phones in Hungary usually are higher than in other industrial nations.

In the UK, this phone was being sold by Home Bargains (as of 29/04/2008) and £-Stretcher (as of 07/06/2008) with a Virgin Mobile SIM (T-Mobile network) for £7.99 (££6.99 -Stretcher). The phones do not seem to have any sort of SIM network lock and have been successfully used with Orange, Vodafone and O2.

In Canada and the United States, this phone was not available through Motorola's normal retail channels. Where available, the North American version was normally sold unlocked, with no SIM card.

In Mexico, this phone was only offered in Prepaid form and most of the time with SIM Lock.

Although this phone was being manufactured largely in India, it had (in mid-2008) become completely unavailable in major metropolitan areas such as Chennai or Madras. This indicated that Motorola was in fact actively phasing out the model in India due to poor sales, perhaps because of the popularity of text messaging in India, which is arguably oversimplified on the F3, anticipating its discontinuation in other countries by 2009.

=== F3c ===
The F3c was available in Q4 2006, and was the CDMA version of the F3.

== Advanced Settings ==
To access the advanced settings, press * * * [number code] * [action] ([action] is the key in the upper left corner of the keypad, the one printed with an upward-pointing arrow in a circle)

=== Documented codes ===
Phone Setting	Number Code
Reset Factory settings	000
Restricted Calling (Phonebook only) ON / OFF	160/161
Keypad tones ON / OFF	250/251
Auto keypad lock ON / OFF	260/261
Set SIM Pin	300
SIM Pin ON / OFF	310/311
Select time format	470
Prepaid Balance Display ON / OFF	500/501
Voice Prompts ON / OFF (1)	510/511
Change Language	520
Set Balance Inquiry Number to use when the “#” key is pressed and held	642
Set Voicemail number	644

(1) can also be toggled by pressing [action] on the volume menu

=== Undocumented codes ===
Phone Setting	Number Code
Display total time of accepted incoming calls	111
Display total time of outgoing calls	121
Switch Audible call minute counter (beep) ON/OFF	130/131
Region Code display ON/OFF	400/401
List available networks with option to change to another network	402
Display network currently receiving service from	480
Display list of networks within range	481
View / Edit Service Cell Number (SMS Service)	643
Delete ALL stored messages	700
Enter SMS prepay query code (?)	701
Maximum SMS Validity	743

The following codes work AS IS, i.e. without entering the * around them

Phone information details	* * 9 9 9 9 * [action]
IMEI number	* # 0 6 # (scroll down for complete number)
