= EPLaR =

Electronics on Plastic by Laser Release (EPLaR) is a method for manufacturing flexible electrophoretic displays using conventional AM-LCD manufacturing equipment, avoiding the need to build new factories. The technology can also be used to manufacture flexible OLED displays using standard OLED fabrication facilities.

The technology was developed by Philips Research and uses standard display glass as used in TFT-LCD processing plants. It is coated with a layer of polyimide using a standard spin-coating procedure used in the production of AM-LCD displays. This polyimide coating can now have a regular TFT matrix formed on top of it in a standard TFT processing plant to form the plastic display, which can then be removed using a laser to finish the display and the glass reused, thus lowering the total cost of manufacture.

The EPLaR process is licensed by Philips for use by Taiwan's Prime View International in its TFT manufacturing plants for manufacture of flexible plastic displays.
