= Samsung U750 Alias 2 =

Mobile phone model

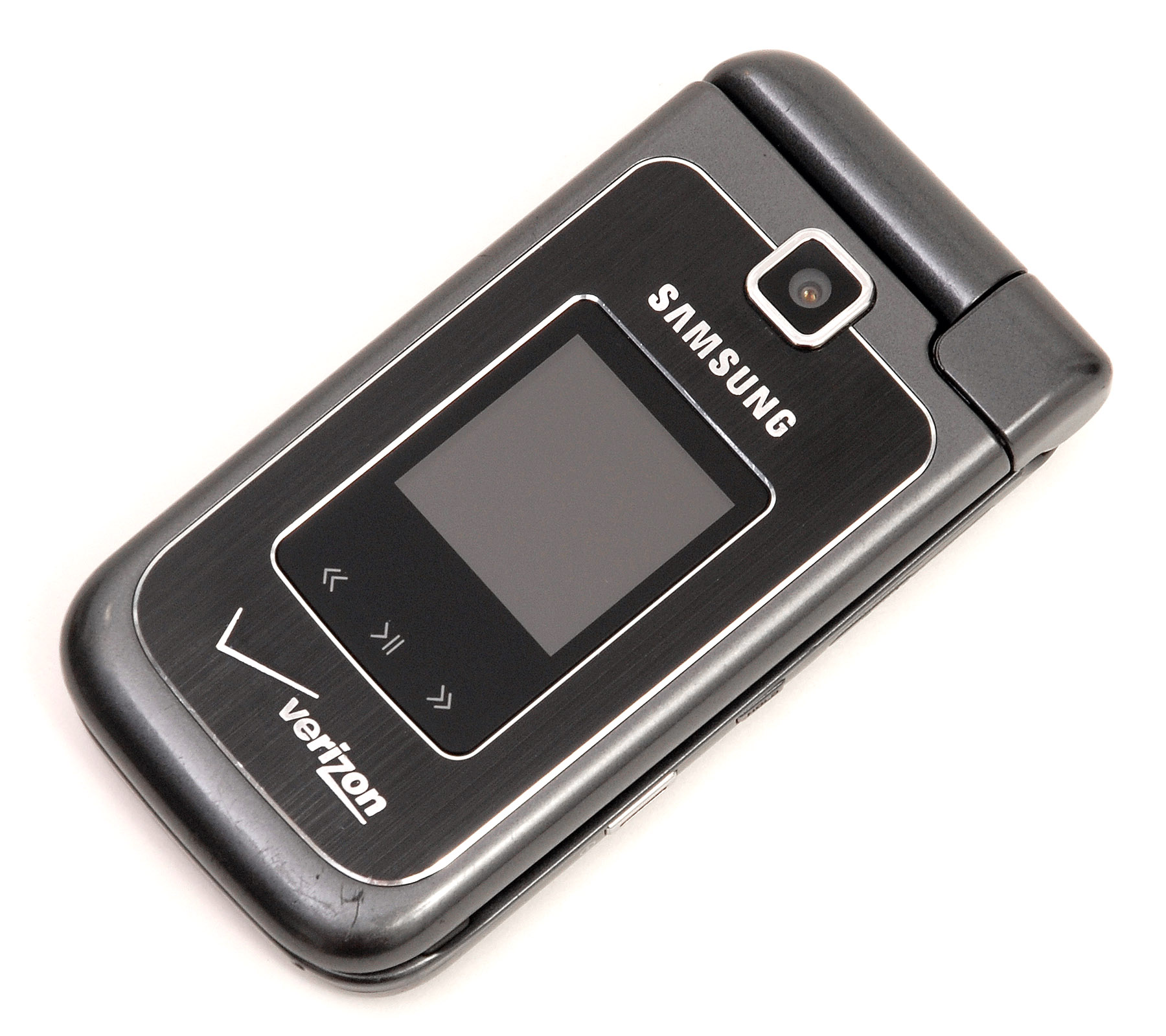
- Manufacturer: Samsung Electronics
- Availability by region: (United States) May 2009
- Predecessor: Samsung U740 Alias
- Compatible networks: CDMA 800/1900 MHz, 1xEVDO
- Form factor: Dual-hinge Clamshell
- Dimensions: (HXWXD) : 2.04” x 4.01” x .67”
- Weight: 3.6 oz (102 g)
- Memory: 100 MB
- Removable storage: MicroSD (supports up to 16 GB card)
- Battery: 880 mAh Li-ion
- Rear camera: 2.0-megapixel
- Display: 240 x 320 px LCD; 262k colors
- External display: 128 x 128 px LCD; 65k colors
- Connectivity: Bluetooth / USB cable
- Data inputs: E-Ink-based keyboard
- Hearing aid compatibility: M4

The Samsung SCH-U750, marketed as Samsung Alias 2 and also as Samsung Zeal, was a cell phone made by Samsung. The phone was only available in metallic gray. It featured a dual-hinge design that could be opened in portrait or landscape style. The Alias 2 featured an E Ink-based keyboard. In horizontal mode it featured a QWERTY keyboard and VCAST music on the Verizon Wireless network within Australia and the USA.

The phone ran on Verizon Wireless's digital and Ev-DO networks until the shutdown of Verizon's 3G networks. The Samsung Alias 2 was released on 11 May 2009 in the United States.

== Features ==
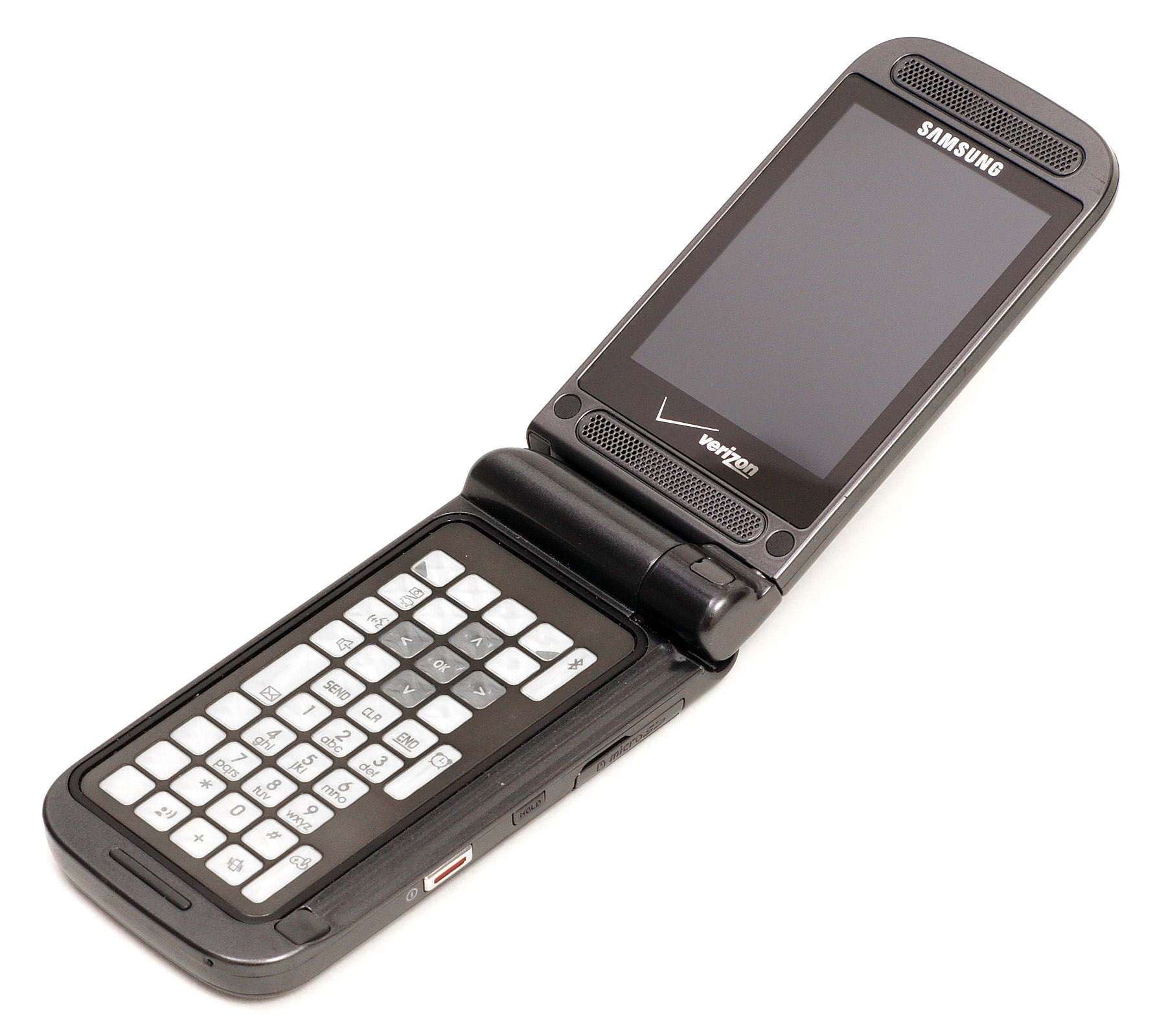
The phone in call mode

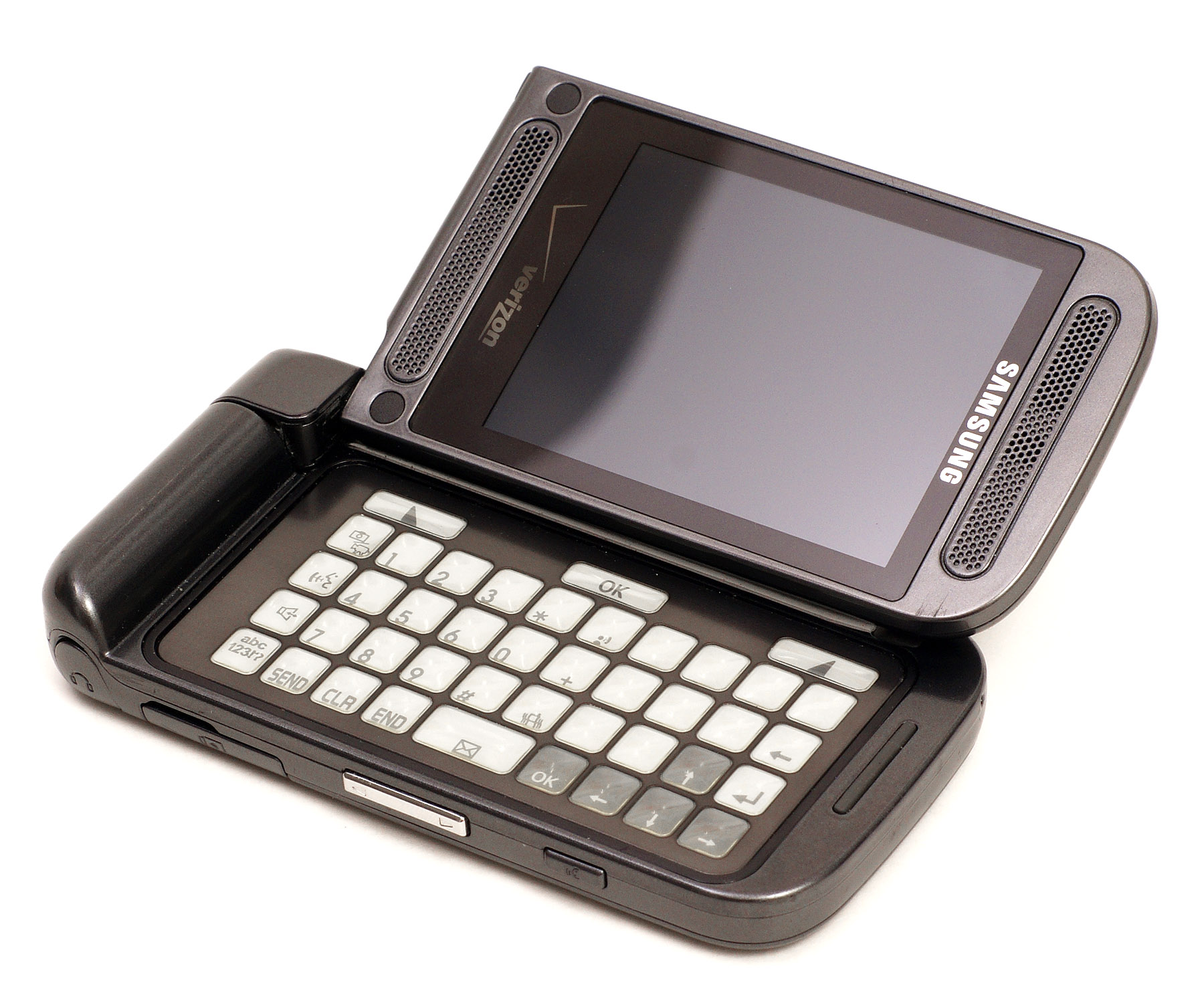
The phone in keyboard mode

Its external features were a postage stamp sized front display, touch sensitive music control buttons and a 2.0-megapixel camera. On the right side there was the power button, a "hold" button, and a microSD card slot. On the left, there was a Voice Activation button, an up/down volume rocker button, a headphone jack, and proprietary charger/data transfer port. Opened in portrait or call mode, a standard numerical dialing pad along with two soft keys, send and end keys, a camera button, a voice command button, and four-directional buttons with an OK key in the center were all available. When in portrait, a user could input text using T9 (predictive text) or flip the phone horizontally for its full keyboard. The phone's 2.0 megapixel camera could take up to 1200 x 1600, and can record video at 176 x 144 at 15fps for the maximum of 10 minutes. The user could also use features in the camera like Night Shot, multi-shot, panorama, self-timer, and various filters. The smaller 128 x 128 1.3 inch display would also display what the camera would be showing when taking pictures of oneself. Opened horizontally, the full QWERTY keypad was usable and a simple button press allowed switching between the various alphanumeric functions. Stereo speakers were mounted on either side of the 2.6-inch TFT display, with a resolution of 240 x 320 (QVGA). The battery was 880 mAh which gave 5 hours of talk time and 14 days stand-by. It had basic features, such as a tip calculator, alarm, calendar, voice memos, and a music player, which supported the MP3, WMA, ACC, and ACC+ formats, and could be controlled by the three touch sensitive buttons on the front of the display when the phone is closed. However, it lacked standard hardware that other manufactures were using at the time, such as micro USB and a 3.5mm headphone jack. It also had a built-in e-mail client that was compatible with Yahoo!, Windows Live, AOL, Verizon.net, and POP. It also supported Mobile IM through AIM, Windows Live Messenger, and Yahoo Messenger. The U750 was compatible with all Verizon services, such as VCAST. It was also equipped with voice recognition, text message dictation, and two flash-based display themes, as well as the standard red Verizon Wireless themes.

After the Alias 2, the Samsung Zeal took over. The complete phone is unchanged from Alias 2 to the Zeal, except for the shape of the camera, which changed from a square to an oval and the color is changed to black.

The phone was discontinued in October 2010.

== Samsung U740 Alias ==
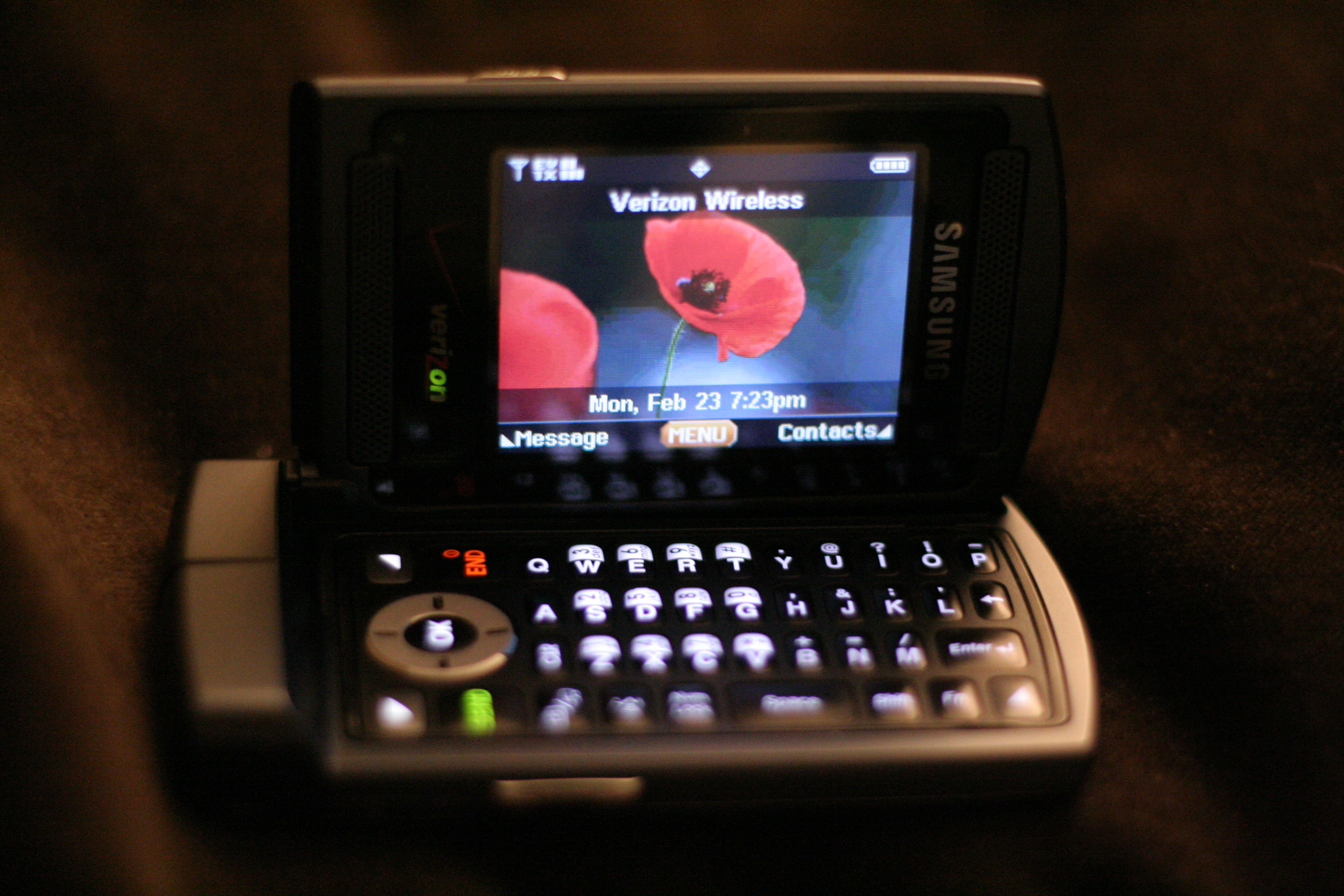
Dimensions: 3.8 in × 2.0 in × 0.6 in (97 mm × 51 mm × 15 mm); 3.6 oz (100 g)

The Samsung Alias 2 was the successor of the original Samsung SCH-U740, which did not feature the unique "magic" e-ink display. The keys were cramped up with all the functions of the e-ink display, which disappointed many users. The phone was available in the United States in March 2007 and in Canada in August 2007. It had 176 x 220 px LCD; 262k colors, main display and 96 x 96 px LCD; 65k colors, external display. Other specifications included were 45 MB memory, 800 mAh Li-ion battery and a 1.3 megapixel camera.
