= Electronic paper =

Paper-like display technology

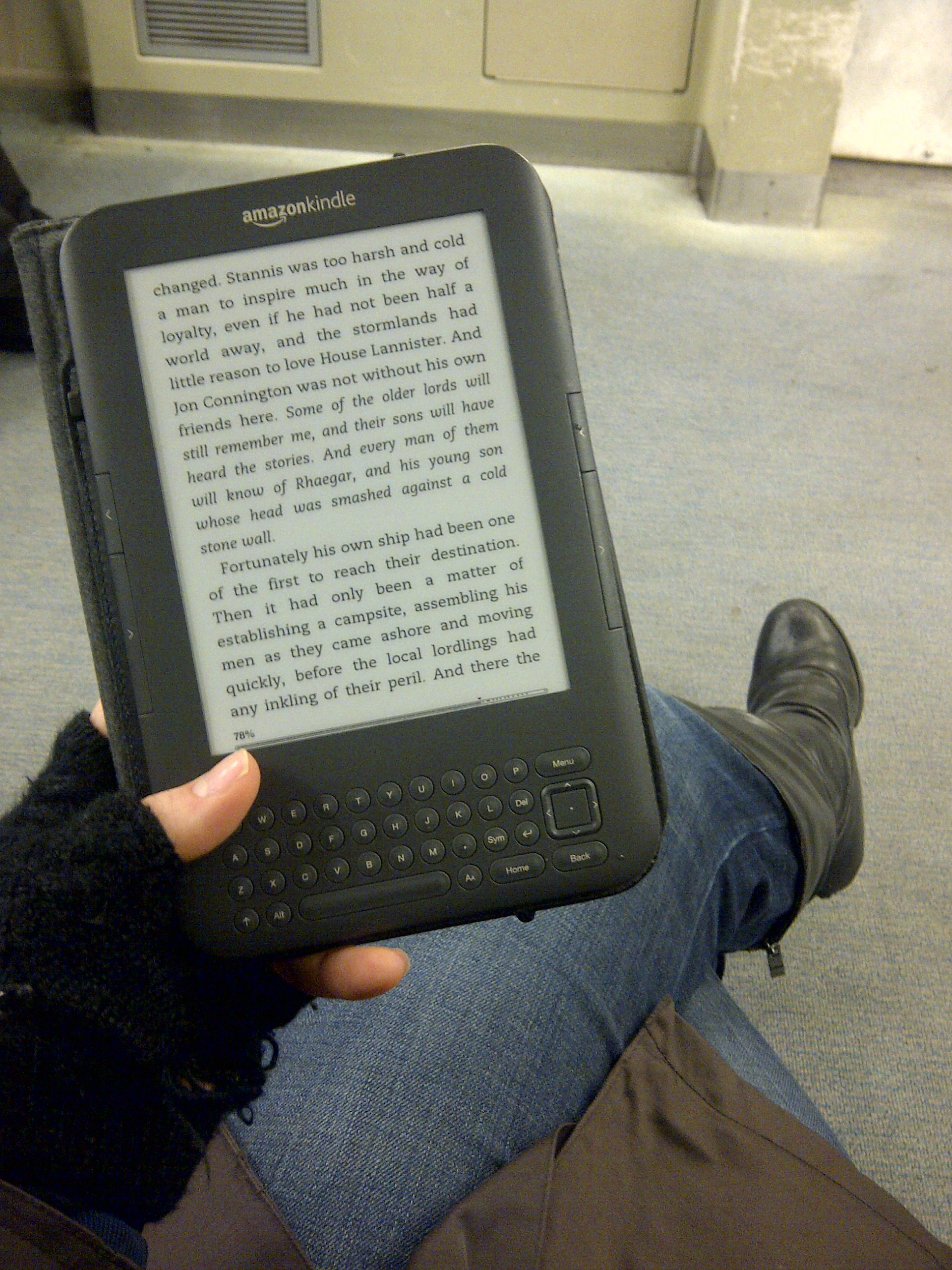
Many e-readers, devices meant to replace traditional books, utilize electronic paper for their displays in order to further resemble paper books; one such example is the Kindle series by Amazon.

Electronic paper or intelligent paper, is a display device that reflects ambient light, thereby mimicking the appearance of ordinary ink on paper. This is in contrast to conventional flat-panel displays, which require additional energy to emit their own light. This configuration may make them more comfortable to read, and provide a wider viewing angle than most light-emitting displays. An ideal e-paper display can be read in direct sunlight without the image appearing to fade.

Technologies include Gyricon, electrowetting, interferometry, and plasmonics. Many electronic paper technologies hold static text and images indefinitely without electricity. Flexible electronic paper uses plastic substrates and plastic electronics for the display backplane. Applications of e-paper include electronic shelf labels and digital signage, bus station time tables, electronic billboards, smartphone displays, and e-readers able to display digital versions of books and magazines.

== Technologies ==
=== Gyricon ===
Electronic paper was first developed in the 1970s by Nick Sheridon at Xerox's Palo Alto Research Center. The first electronic paper, called Gyricon, consisted of polyethylene spheres between 75 and 106 micrometers across. Each sphere is a Janus particle composed of negatively charged black plastic on one side and positively charged white plastic on the other (each bead is thus a dipole). The spheres are embedded in a transparent silicone sheet, with each sphere suspended in a bubble of oil so that it can rotate freely. The polarity of the voltage applied to each pair of electrodes then determines whether the white or black side is face-up, thus giving the pixel a white or black appearance. A benefit of this type of e-paper is that the contents are retained even after the voltage have been stopped. At the FPD 2008 exhibition, Japanese company Soken demonstrated a wall with electronic wall-paper using this technology. In 2007, the Estonian company Visitret Displays was developing this kind of display using polyvinylidene fluoride (PVDF) as the material for the spheres, dramatically improving the video speed and decreasing the control voltage needed.

=== Electrophoretic ===
Appearance of pixels

An electrophoretic display (EPD) forms images by rearranging charged pigment particles with an applied electric field. In the simplest implementation of an EPD, titanium dioxide (titania) particles approximately one micrometer in diameter are dispersed in a hydrocarbon oil. A dark-colored dye is also added to the oil, along with surfactants and charging agents that cause the particles to take on an electric charge. This mixture is placed between two parallel, conductive plates separated by a gap of 10 to 100 micrometres. When a voltage is applied across the two plates, the particles migrate electrophoretically to the plate that bears the opposite charge from that on the particles. When the particles are located at the front (viewing) side of the display, it appears white, because the light is scattered back to the viewer by the high-index titania particles. When the particles are located at the rear side of the display, it appears dark, because the light is absorbed by the colored dye. If the rear electrode is divided into a number of small picture elements (pixels), then an image can be formed by applying the appropriate voltage to each region of the display to create a pattern of reflecting and absorbing regions.

EPDs are typically addressed using MOSFET-based thin-film transistor (TFT) technology. TFTs are often used to form a high-density image in an EPD. A common application for TFT-based EPDs are e-readers. Electrophoretic displays are considered prime examples of the electronic paper category, because of their paper-like appearance and low power consumption. Examples of commercial electrophoretic displays include the high-resolution active matrix displays used in the Amazon Kindle, Barnes & Noble Nook, Sony Reader, Kobo eReader, and iRex iLiad e-readers. These displays are constructed from an electrophoretic imaging film manufactured by E Ink Corporation. A mobile phone that used the technology is the Motorola Fone.

Electrophoretic Display technology has also been developed by SiPix and Bridgestone/Delta. SiPix is now part of E Ink Corporation. The SiPix design uses a flexible 0.15 mm Microcup architecture, instead of E Ink's 0.04 mm diameter microcapsules. Bridgestone Corp.'s Advanced Materials Division cooperated with Delta Optoelectronics Inc. in developing Quick Response Liquid Powder Display technology.

Electrophoretic displays can be manufactured using the Electronics on Plastic by Laser Release (EPLaR) process, developed by Philips Research, to enable existing AM-LCD manufacturing plants to create flexible plastic displays.

==== Microencapsulated electrophoretic display ====
Scheme of an electrophoretic display

Scheme of an electrophoretic display using color filters

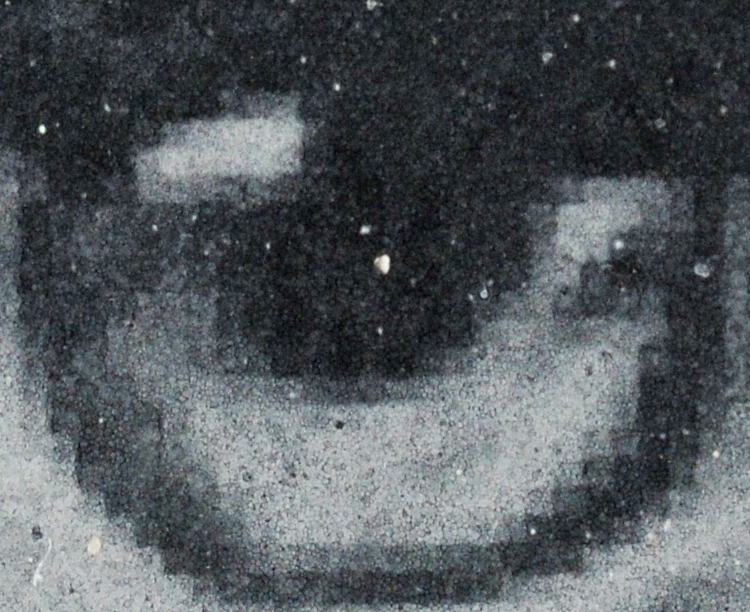
Macro photograph of Kindle 3 screen; microcapsules are evident at full size.

In the 1990s another type of electronic ink based on a microencapsulated electrophoretic display was conceived and prototyped by a team of undergraduates at MIT as described in their Nature paper. J.D. Albert, Barrett Comiskey, Joseph Jacobson, Jeremy Rubin and Russ Wilcox co-founded E Ink Corporation in 1997 to commercialize the technology. E Ink subsequently formed a partnership with Philips Components two years later to develop and market the technology. In 2005, Philips sold the electronic paper business as well as its related patents to Prime View International.

"It has for many years been an ambition of researchers in display media to create a flexible low-cost system that is the electronic analog of paper. In this context, microparticle-based displays have long intrigued researchers. Switchable contrast in such displays is achieved by the electromigration of highly scattering or absorbing microparticles (in the size range 0.1–5 μm), quite distinct from the molecular-scale properties that govern the behavior of the more familiar liquid-crystal displays. Micro-particle-based displays possess intrinsic bistability, exhibit extremely low power d.c. field addressing and have demonstrated high contrast and reflectivity. These features, combined with a near-lambertian viewing characteristic, result in an 'ink on paper' look. But such displays have to date suffered from short lifetimes and difficulty in manufacture. Here we report the synthesis of an electrophoretic ink based on the microencapsulation of an electrophoretic dispersion. The use of a microencapsulated electrophoretic medium solves the lifetime issues and permits the fabrication of a bistable electronic display solely by means of printing. This system may satisfy the practical requirements of electronic paper."

This used tiny microcapsules filled with electrically charged white particles suspended in a colored oil. In early versions, the underlying circuitry controlled whether the white particles were at the top of the capsule (so it looked white to the viewer) or at the bottom of the capsule (so the viewer saw the color of the oil). This was essentially a reintroduction of the well-known electrophoretic display technology, but microcapsules meant the display could be made on flexible plastic sheets instead of glass. One early version of the electronic paper consists of a sheet of very small transparent capsules, each about 40 micrometers across. Each capsule contains an oily solution containing black dye (the electronic ink), with numerous white titanium dioxide particles suspended within. The particles are slightly negatively charged, and each one is naturally white. The screen holds microcapsules in a layer of liquid polymer, sandwiched between two arrays of electrodes, the upper of which is transparent. The two arrays are aligned to divide the sheet into pixels, and each pixel corresponds to a pair of electrodes situated on either side of the sheet. The sheet is laminated with transparent plastic for protection, resulting in an overall thickness of 80 micrometers, or twice that of ordinary paper. The network of electrodes connects to display circuitry, which turns the electronic ink 'on' and 'off' at specific pixels by applying a voltage to specific electrode pairs. A negative charge to the surface electrode repels the particles to the bottom of local capsules, forcing the black dye to the surface and turning the pixel black. Reversing the voltage has the opposite effect. It forces the particles to the surface, turning the pixel white. A more recent implementation of this concept requires only one layer of electrodes beneath the microcapsules. These are commercially referred to as Active Matrix Electrophoretic Displays (AMEPD).

=== Reflective LCD ===
This technology is similar to common LCD while the backlight panel is substituted by a reflective surface. A comparable technology is also obtainable in backlight LCDs by software or hardware deactivating the backlight control.

=== Electrowetting ===
Electrowetting display (EWD) is based on controlling the shape of a confined water/oil interface by an applied voltage. With no voltage applied, the (colored) oil forms a flat film between the water and a hydrophobic (water-repellent) insulating coating of an electrode, resulting in a colored pixel. When a voltage is applied between the electrode and the water, the interfacial tension between the water and the coating changes. As a result, the stacked state is no longer stable, causing the water to move the oil aside. This makes a partly transparent pixel, or, if a reflective white surface is under the switchable element, a white pixel. Because of the small pixel size, the user only experiences the average reflection, which provides a high-brightness, high-contrast switchable element.

Displays based on electrowetting provide several attractive features. The switching between white and colored reflection is fast enough to display video content. It is a low-power, low-voltage technology, and displays based on the effect can be made flat and thin. The reflectivity and contrast are better than or equal to other reflective display types and approach the visual qualities of paper. In addition, the technology offers a unique path toward high-brightness full-color displays, leading to displays that are four times brighter than reflective LCDs and twice as bright as other emerging technologies. Instead of using red, green, and blue (RGB) filters or alternating segments of the three primary colors, which effectively result in only one-third of the display reflecting light in the desired color, electrowetting allows for a system in which one sub-pixel can switch two different colors independently.

This results in the availability of two-thirds of the display area to reflect light in any desired color. This is achieved by building up a pixel with a stack of two independently controllable colored oil films plus a color filter.

The colors are cyan, magenta, and yellow, which is a subtractive system, comparable to the principle used in inkjet printing. Compared to LCD, brightness is gained because no polarisers are required.

==== Electrofluidic ====
Electrofluidic display is a variation of an electrowetting display that place an aqueous pigment dispersion inside a tiny reservoir. The reservoir comprises less than 5-10% of the viewable pixel area and therefore the pigment is substantially hidden from view. Voltage is used to electromechanically pull the pigment out of the reservoir and spread it as a film directly behind the viewing substrate. As a result, the display takes on color and brightness similar to that of conventional pigments printed on paper. When voltage is removed liquid surface tension causes the pigment dispersion to rapidly recoil into the reservoir. The technology can potentially provide greater than 85% white state reflectance for electronic paper.

The core technology was invented at the Novel Devices Laboratory at the University of Cincinnati and there are working prototypes developed by collaboration with Sun Chemical, Polymer Vision and Gamma Dynamics.

It has a wide margin in critical aspects such as brightness, color saturation and response time. Because the optically active layer can be less than 15 micrometres thick, there is strong potential for rollable displays.

=== Interferometric modulator (Mirasol) ===
The technology used in electronic visual displays that can create various colors via interference of reflected light. The color is selected with an electrically switched light modulator comprising a microscopic cavity that is switched on and off using driver integrated circuits similar to those used to address liquid-crystal displays (LCD).

=== Plasmonic electronic display ===
Plasmonic nanostructures with conductive polymers have also been suggested as one kind of electronic paper. The material has two parts. The first part is a highly reflective metasurface made by metal-insulator-metal films tens of nanometers in thickness including nanoscale holes. The metasurfaces can reflect different colors depending on the thickness of the insulator. The standard RGB color schema can be used as pixels for full-color displays. The second part is a polymer with optical absorption controllable by an electrochemical potential. After growing the polymer on the plasmonic metasurfaces, the reflection of the metasurfaces can be modulated by the applied voltage. This technology presents broad range colors, high polarization-independent reflection (>50 %), strong contrast (>30 %), a fast response time (hundreds of ms), and long-term stability. In addition, it has ultralow power consumption (< 0.5 mW/cm2) and potential for high resolution (>10000 dpi). Since the ultrathin metasurfaces are flexible and the polymer is soft, the whole system can be bent. Desired future improvements for this technology include bistability, cheaper materials and implementation with TFT arrays.

=== Retina E-paper ===
In 2025, researchers at Uppsala University introduced a "retina electronic paper" — a reflective display technology that reaches the resolution limit of the human eye. Unlike emissive displays such as LEDs or OLEDs, which lose brightness and contrast as pixel sizes shrink, retina E-paper employs electrically tunable nanostructures made of WO₃ that reflect ambient light efficiently. Each color "metapixel," composed of nanoscale WO₃ disks, can be dynamically modulated through an electrochemical insulator-to-metal transition, enabling color tuning and video-rate operation (>25 Hz). The resulting display achieves pixel densities above '25,000 pixels per inch', with high reflectance (~80%) and optical contrast (~50%), while consuming very low power. The approach combines the visual comfort of paper-like viewing with the precision of nanophotonic control, and has been described as a potential platform for future ultra-high-resolution, energy-efficient VR/AR systems enabling fully immersive visual experiences.

=== Other technologies ===
Other research efforts into e-paper have involved using organic transistors embedded into flexible substrates, including attempts to build them into conventional paper. Simple color e-paper consists of a thin colored optical filter added to the monochrome technology described above. The array of pixels is divided into triads, typically consisting of the standard cyan, magenta and yellow, in the same way as CRT monitors (although using subtractive primary colors as opposed to additive primary colors). The display is then controlled like any other electronic color display.

== History ==
E Ink Corporation of E Ink Holdings Inc. released the first colored E Ink displays to be used in a marketed product. The Ectaco jetBook Color was released in 2012 as the first colored electronic ink device, which used E Ink's Triton display technology. E Ink in early 2015 also announced another color electronic ink technology called Prism. This new technology is a color changing film that can be used for e-readers, but Prism is also marketed as a film that can be integrated into architectural design such as "wall, ceiling panel, or entire room instantly." The disadvantage of these current color displays is that they are considerably more expensive than standard E Ink displays. The jetBook Color costs roughly nine times more than other popular e-readers such as the Amazon Kindle. As of January 2015, Prism had not been announced to be used in the plans for any e-reader devices.

== Applications ==
An e-paper display on a watch refreshes to remove ghosts.

Several companies are simultaneously developing electronic paper and ink. While the technologies used by each company provide many of the same features, each has its own distinct technological advantages. Electronic paper (e-paper) technologies are used where a paper-like appearance, wide viewing angles, and very low power consumption are important. All electronic paper technologies face the following general challenges:

- A method for encapsulation
- An ink or active material to fill the encapsulation
- Electronics to activate the ink

Electronic ink can be applied to flexible or rigid materials. For flexible displays, the base requires a thin, flexible material tough enough to withstand considerable wear, such as extremely thin plastic.

=== E-readers and digital publication ===
Electrophoretic displays are widely used in e-readers and other devices intended primarily for text reading because they provide high reflectivity, good sunlight readability and extremely low power consumption when displaying static content. The method of how the inks are encapsulated and then applied to the substrate is what distinguishes each company from others. These processes are complex and are carefully guarded industry secrets. Nevertheless, making electronic paper is less complex and costly than LCDs.

There are many approaches to electronic paper, with many companies developing technology in this area. Other technologies being applied to electronic paper include modifications of liquid-crystal displays, electrochromic displays, and the electronic equivalent of an Etch A Sketch at Kyushu University. Advantages of electronic paper include low power usage (power is only drawn when the display is updated), flexibility and better readability than most displays. Electronic ink can be printed on any surface, including walls, billboards, product labels and T-shirts. The ink's flexibility would also make it possible to develop rollable displays for electronic devices.

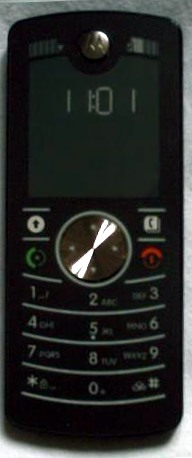
The Motorola F3 uses an e-paper display instead of an LCD.

=== Wristwatches ===
In December 2005, Seiko released the first electronic ink based watch called the Spectrum SVRD001 wristwatch, which has a flexible electrophoretic display and in March 2010 Seiko released a second generation of this famous electronic ink watch with an active matrix display. The Pebble smart watch (2013) uses a low-power memory LCD manufactured by Sharp for its e-paper display.

In 2019, Fossil launched a hybrid smartwatch called the Hybrid HR, integrating an always on electronic ink display with physical hands and dial to simulate the look of a traditional analog watch.

Recent research has demonstrated electrophoretic and photonic-crystal–based reflective display materials capable of bistable color states, allowing images to be maintained without continuous power consumption. Such technologies are being investigated as a potential pathway toward low-power color electronic paper displays which retain the readability and energy efficiency of traditional monochrome e-paper. The study also suggests that reflective, bistable color display approaches could be suitable for future wearable and portable devices, where sunlight visibility and longer battery life are essential to performance requirements.

=== E-book readers ===
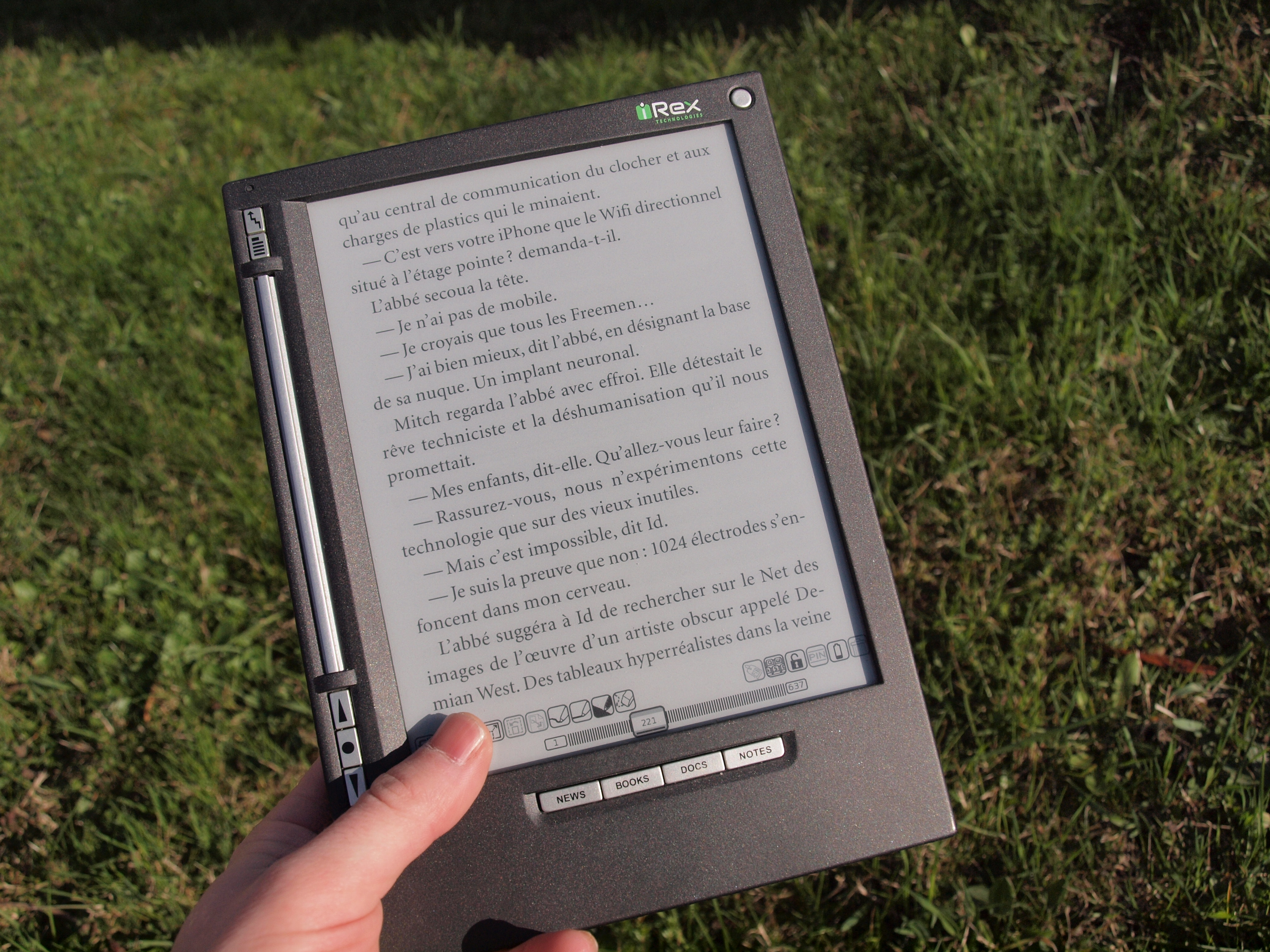
iLiad e-book reader equipped with an e-paper display visible in the sunlight

In 2004, Sony released the Librié in Japan, the first e-book reader with an electronic paper E Ink display. In September 2006, Sony released the PRS-500 Sony Reader e-book reader in the USA. On October 2, 2007, Sony announced the PRS-505, an updated version of the Reader. In November 2008, Sony released the PRS-700BC, which incorporated a backlight and a touchscreen.

In late 2007, Amazon began producing and marketing the Amazon Kindle, an e-book reader with an e-paper display. In February 2009, Amazon released the Kindle 2 and in May 2009 the larger Kindle DX was announced. In July 2010 the third-generation Kindle was announced, with notable design changes. The fourth generation of Kindle, called Touch, was announced in September 2011 that was the Kindle's first departure from keyboards and page turn buttons in favor of touchscreens. In September 2012, Amazon announced the fifth generation of the Kindle called the Paperwhite, which incorporates a LED frontlight and a higher contrast display.

In 2009, Barnes and Noble launched the Barnes & Noble Nook, running an Android operating system. It differs from other e-readers in having a replaceable battery, and a separate touch-screen color LCD below the main electronic paper reading screen.

In 2017, Sony and reMarkable offered e-books tailored for writing with a smart stylus.

=== Mobile phones ===
Motorola's low-cost mobile phone, the Motorola F3, uses an alphanumeric black-and-white electrophoretic display.

The Samsung Alias 2 mobile phone incorporates electronic ink from E Ink into the keypad, which allows the keypad to change character sets and orientation while in different display modes.

=== Smartphones ===
On December 12, 2012, Yota Devices announced the first "YotaPhone" prototype and was later released in December 2013, a unique double-display smartphone. It has a 4.3-inch, HD LCD on the front and an electronic ink display on the back.

On May and June 2020, Hisense released the Hisense A5c and A5 pro cc, the first color electronic ink smartphones. With a single color display, with a togglable front light running android 9 and Android 10.

=== Computer monitors ===
Electronic paper is used on computer monitors like the 13.3 inch Dasung Paperlike 3 HD and 25.3 inch Paperlike 253.

=== Laptop ===
Some laptops like Lenovo ThinkBook Plus use e-paper as a secondary screen. Other common laptops use reflective LCD panels with no backlight. Furthermore, some operating systems e.g. Xubuntu, Kali Linux provide a control to dim backlight LCD brightness to 0% in internal monitors, while crystals keep working so that the display is lighted by ambient light as if it were paper.

=== Tablets ===
In 2020, Onyx released the first frontlit 13.3 inch electronic paper Android tablet, the Boox Max Lumi. At the end of the same year, Bigme released the first 10.3 inch color electronic paper Android tablet, the Bigme B1 Pro. This was also the first large electronic paper tablet to support 4g cellular data.

=== Newspapers ===
In February 2006, the Flemish daily De Tijd distributed an electronic version of the paper to select subscribers in a limited marketing study, using a pre-release version of the iRex iLiad. This was the first recorded application of electronic ink to newspaper publishing.

The French daily Les Échos announced the official launch of an electronic version of the paper on a subscription basis in September 2007. Two offers were available, combining a one-year subscription and a reading device. The offer included either a light (176g) reading device (adapted for Les Echos by Ganaxa) or the iRex iLiad. Two different processing platforms were used to deliver readable information of the daily, one based on the newly developed GPP electronic ink platform from Ganaxa, and the other one developed internally by Les Echos.

=== Displays embedded in smart cards ===
Flexible display cards enable financial payment cardholders to generate a one-time password to reduce online banking and transaction fraud. Electronic paper offers a flat and thin alternative to existing key fob tokens for data security. The world's first ISO compliant smart card with an embedded display was developed by Innovative Card Technologies and nCryptone in 2005. The cards were manufactured by Nagra ID.

=== Status displays ===
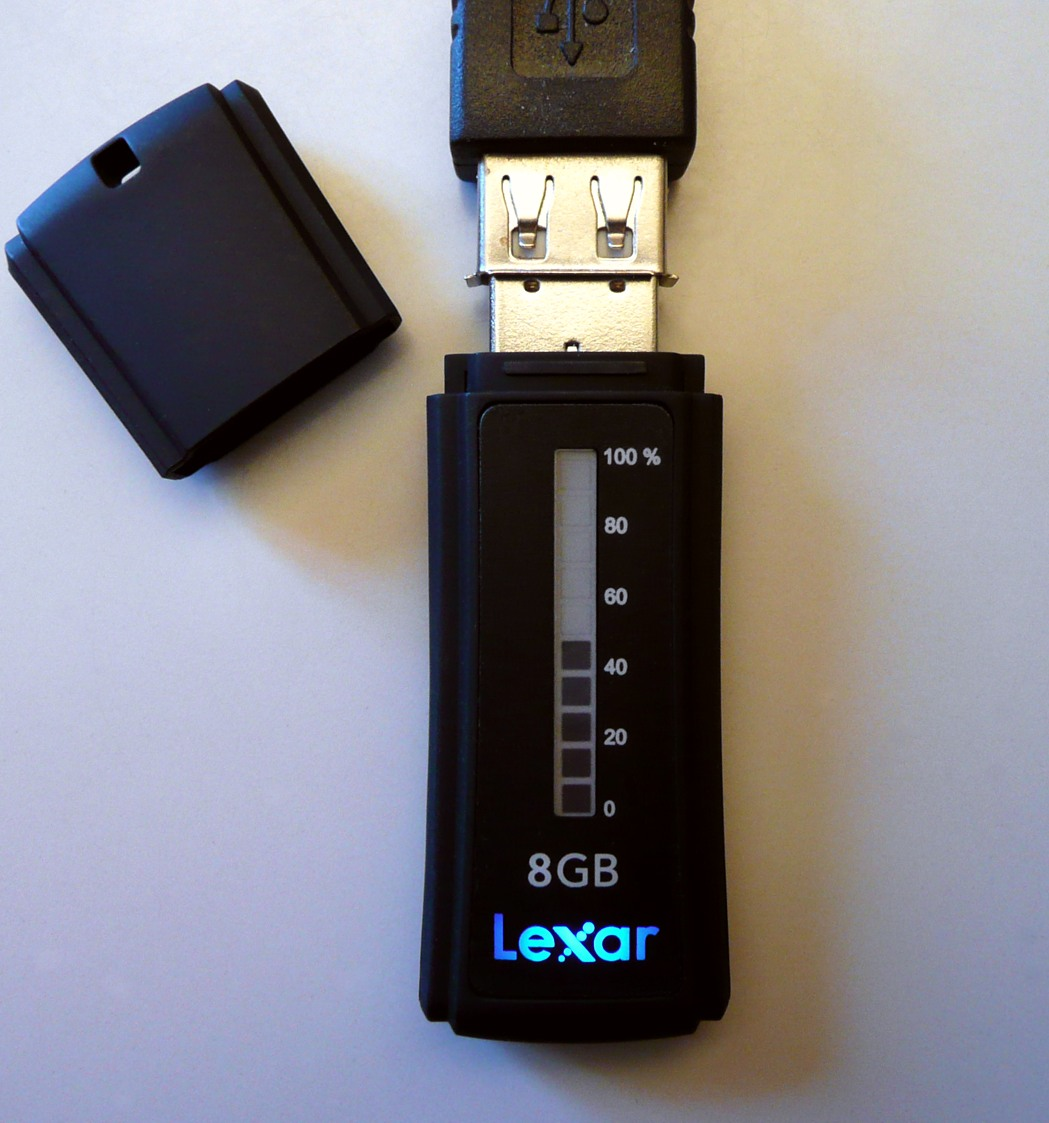
USB flash drive with E Ink-implemented capacity meter of available flash memory

Some devices, like USB flash drives, have used electronic paper to display status information, such as available storage space. Once the image on the electronic paper has been set, it requires no power to maintain, so the readout can be seen even when the flash drive is not plugged in.

=== Retail signage and Electronic shelf labels ===
E-paper based electronic shelf labels (ESL) are used to digitally display the prices of goods at retail stores, enabling centrally managed, wireless updates of prices and product information while reducing paper waste and staff time for manual updates. Electronic-paper-based labels are updated via two-way infrared or radio technology and powered by a rechargeable coin cell. Some variants use ZBD (zenithal bistable display) which is more similar to LCD but does not need power to retain an image.

=== Public transport timetables ===
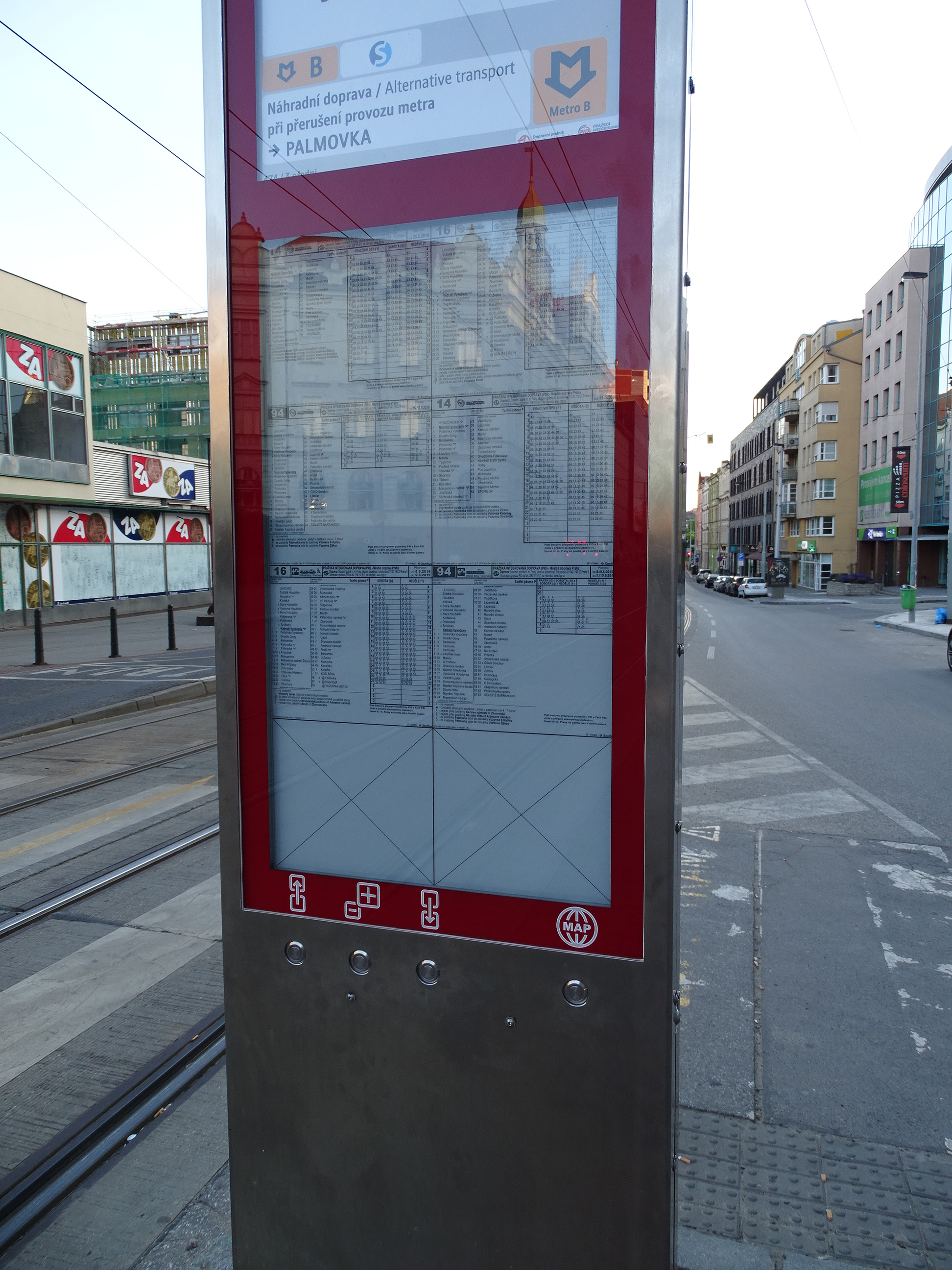
Tram timetables on e-paper. Prague, prototype from May 2019.

E-paper displays at bus or trams stops can be remotely updated. Compared to LED or liquid-crystal displays (LCDs), they consume lower energy and the text or graphics stays visible during a power failure. Compared to LCDs, it is easily visible under full sunshine.

=== Digital signage ===
Because of its energy-saving properties, electronic paper has proved a technology suited to digital signage applications.

=== Electronic tags ===
Typically, e-paper electronic tags integrate e-ink technology with wireless interfaces like NFC or UHF. They are most commonly used as employees' ID cards or as production labels to track manufacturing changes and status. E-paper tags are also increasingly being used as shipping labels, especially in the case of reusable boxes. An interesting feature provided by some e-paper Tags manufacturers is batteryless design. This means that the power needed for a display's content update is provided wirelessly and the module itself doesn't contain any battery.

=== Other ===
Other proposed applications include clothes, digital photo frames, information boards, and keyboards. Keyboards with dynamically changeable keys are useful for less represented languages, non-standard keyboard layouts such as Dvorak, or for special non-alphabetical applications such as video editing or games. The reMarkable is a writer tablet for reading and taking notes. E-paper has also been used in smart packaging applications such as pharmaceutical reminders, interactive product labels and traceability tags.

== Environmental considerations ==
Electronic paper (e-paper) and its technologies and applications present both potential environmental benefits and impacts, depending on the specific use, production methods, and end-of-life management. Some lifecycle studies note potential sustainability advantages for replacing frequently updated paper signage, though impacts depend on manufacturing and battery longevity. E-paper displays typically consume power only when the displayed content changes, which can result in significant lower energy use during operation compared with emissive display technologies such as LCDs or OLEDs, particularly in applications with largely static content. This characteristic has led to their adoption in applications such as electronic shelf labels and signage, where reduced energy consumption may contribute to lower operational emissions. E-paper systems may also reduce the use of disposable printed paper in applications that require frequent content updates, such as retail pricing or public information displays. However, studies show that the environmental benefits depend on device longevity and usage patterns, and may be diminished if electronic labels or displays have short service lives or are frequently replaced. At the same time, concerns have been raised regarding the environmental footprint of e-paper manufacturing and disposal. Manufacturing processes involve plastics, electronic components, and specialized materials, while many e-paper devices rely on batteries, contributing to resource extraction impacts and electronic waste if not properly recycled. In addition, laminated and composite structure of e-paper displays can make end-of-life recycling more complex. Overall, lifecycle analyses suggest that the environmental impact of electronic paper is context-dependent, balancing lower energy consumption during use against manufacturing impacts, battery use, and end-of-life recycling considerations. The balance of these factors depends on device lifespan, usage, patterns and the effectiveness of recycling and disposal management systems.

== See also ==
- ebook
- Embedded controller
- Flexible display
- Flexible electronics
- Hardware Attached on Top (HAT)
- History of display technology
- Pinhole glasses
- Raspberry Pi/Arduino
- Raw display
- Serial Peripheral Interface
