= Gyricon =

Type of E Ink display

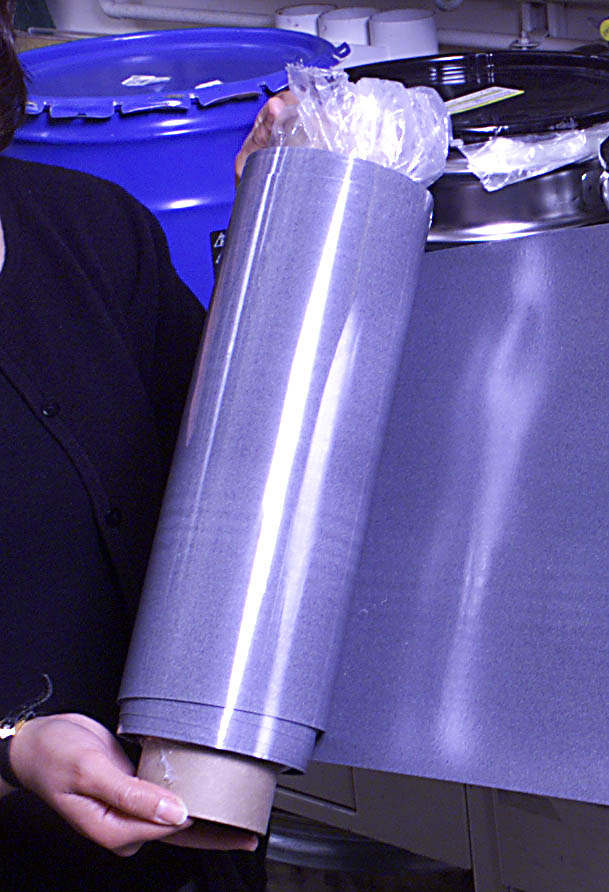
A roll of Gyricon.

Gyricon is a type of electronic paper developed at the Xerox PARC (Palo Alto Research Center). It has many of the same properties as paper: it is flexible, contains an image, and is viewable from a wide angle, but it can be erased and written thousands of times.

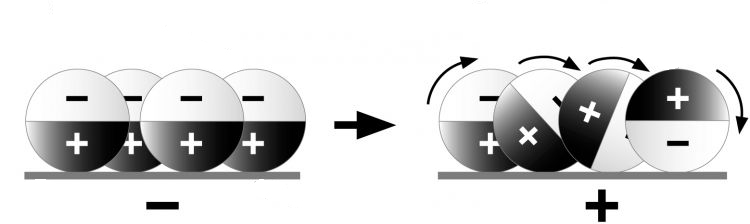
A scheme of Gyricon beads rotating.

A Gyricon sheet is a thin layer of transparent plastic, in which millions of small beads, somewhat like toner particles, are randomly dispersed. The beads, each contained in an oil-filled cavity, are free to rotate within those cavities. The beads are "bichromal", with hemispheres of two contrasting colors (e.g. black and white, red and white), and charged, so they exhibit an electrical dipole. When voltage is applied to the surface of the sheet, the beads rotate to present one colored side to the viewer. Voltages can be applied to the surface to create images such as text and pictures. The image will persist until new voltage patterns are applied

As of December, 2005, Xerox closed down the direct subsidiary Gyricon LLC, their Gyricon e-paper display business, and is focusing on licensing the technology. The company have said that the reason for their closure has been their inability to source backplane technology for their Gyricon frontplane at a price of less than $10 per square foot (US$100/m^{2}). Being able to achieve a price of under $10 was said to be critical to the success of marketing their e-paper-based electronic signage products. Although the company will stop direct manufacture and sale of Gyricon e-paper display products, it will, however, still be licensing their frontplane technology to other users.
