= Attentive user interface =

Attentive user interfaces (AUI) are user interfaces that manage the user's attention. For instance, an AUI can manage notifications, deciding when to interrupt the user, the kind of warnings, and the level of detail of the messages presented to the user. Attentive user interfaces, by generating only the relevant information, can in particular be used to display information in a way that increase the effectiveness of the interaction.

According to Roel Vertegaal, there are four main types of attentive user interfaces:

- Visual attention
- Turn management
- Interruption decision interfaces
- Visual detail management interfaces

== See also ==
- Adaptive hypermedia
- Attention management
