= Paul Dolan (behavioural scientist) =

British behavioural scientist (born 1968)

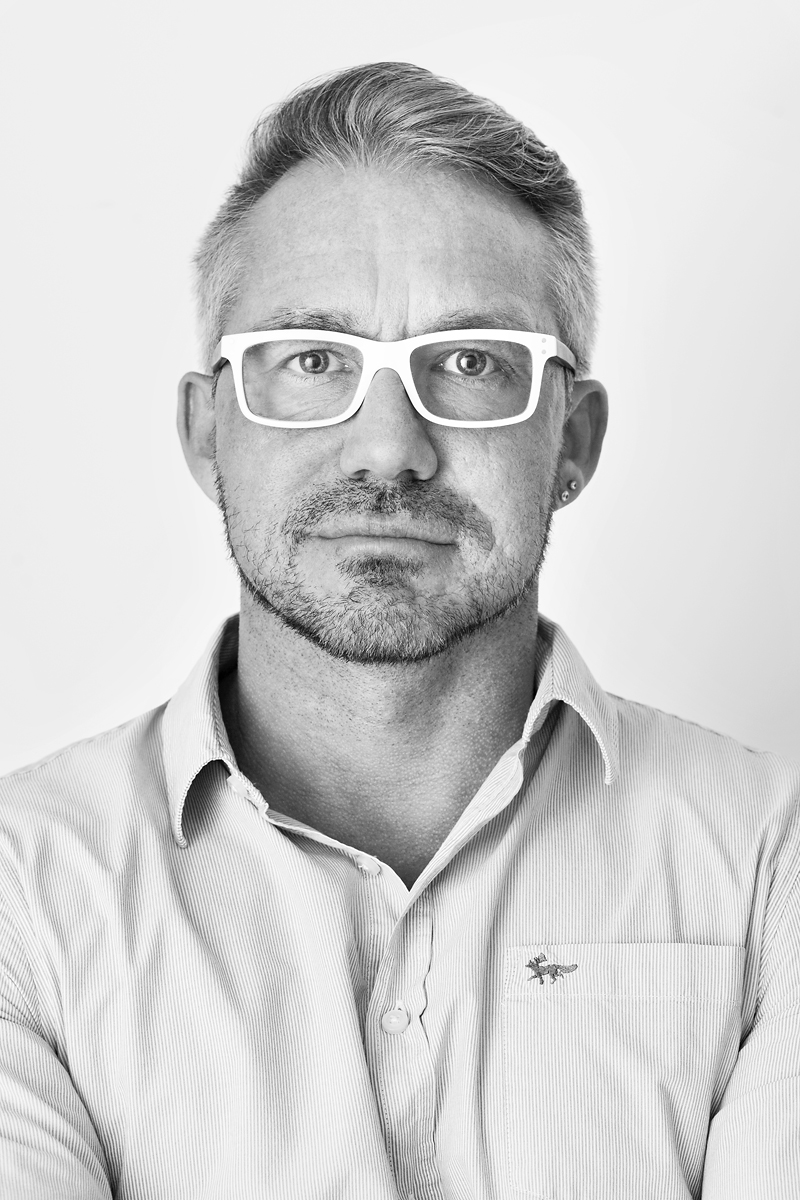
- Born: 10 May 1968 (age 58); London, United Kingdom
- Awards: Philip Leverhulme Prize in economics for contribution to health economics

Education
- Education: University of York

Philosophical work
- Main interests: Behavioural sciences and Happiness
- Notable works: Happiness by Design
- Website: pauldolan.co.uk

Paul Dolan (born 10 May 1968, in London) is Professor of Behavioural Science in the Department in Psychological and Behavioural Science at the London School of Economics and Political Science. He is Director of the Executive MSc in Behavioural Science which began in September 2014. Dolan conducts research on the measurement of happiness, its causes and consequences, and the implications for public policy, publishing in both scholarly and popular outlets. He has previously held academic posts at York, Newcastle, Sheffield and Imperial College London and he has been a visiting scholar at Princeton University. He is the author of three popular press books: Happiness by Design, Happy Ever After, and Beliefism, and the creator and presenter of the Duck-Rabbit podcast.

== Education ==
Dolan gained his degree in economics from Swansea University in 1989. His masters and doctorate on "Issues in the valuation of health outcomes" both came from University of York in 1991 and 1997 respectively.

== Career ==
Dolan has more than 120 peer-reviewed publications, and over 36,000 citations, which cover many topics including behavioural science, subjective wellbeing, equity in health and health valuation.

He is an author of the Mindspace report published by the UK Cabinet Office, which seeks to apply lessons from the psychological and behavioural sciences to social policy.

In 2013, Dolan appeared at the Hay Festival in Cartagena de Indias, Colombia, and discussed the role of modern technology and happiness, as well as his work on experiences of purpose, attention, and happiness. He also gave the Queen's Lecture on "Happiness by Design" at the TU Berlin in November 2013. Dolan has also spoken at a variety of national and international meetings and conferences, and made numerous media appearances, such as on the BBC1 television programme Lose Weight for Love. He was listed by The Times newspaper as one of the world's greatest minds.

Happiness By Design

On 28 August 2014, Dolan published his book Happiness by Design, with foreword by Nobel Prize-winner Daniel Kahneman. The theme of the book is using the tools of behavioural science to help promote individual happiness by reallocating attention. Dolan promoted this book in a talk at the Hay Festival on 30 May 2015. It was called "the book that will make you quit your job" in the New Statesman because of a story in the book illustrating the difference between two forms of happiness.

=== Happy Ever After ===
On 17 January 2019, Dolan published his book, which was heavily debated and widely covered in the press, Happy Ever After. It led to praise for being a passionate and provocative manifesto for a better society and criticism over disputed statistical analyses.

The theme of the book is using social science to interrogate popular narratives about what makes for a good life. The Times wrote that Happy Ever After contains "many surprising insights". The book draws on a variety of studies ranging over wellbeing, inequality and discrimination, and was described by Guardian writer Oliver Burkeman as "one of the most rigorous articulations of the new mood of acceptance".

The book contained provocative claims about the association between marriage and happiness, suggesting that single women are happier than married women. In promoting the book, Dolan said, “Married people are happier than other population subgroups, but only when their spouse is in the room when they’re asked how happy they are. When the spouse is not present: f***ing miserable.” Economist Gray Kimbrough pointed out that this conclusion was based on a misunderstanding of the term “spouse present” in the American Time Use Survey, which doesn't mean "spouse not in the room" but rather "spouse not living in the household". Kimbrough also argued that Dolan's claims about how happiness correlates with men's and women's happiness were not supported by the data sources cited in the book. Vox highlighted the case as an example of "books by prestigious and well-regarded researchers go[ing] to print with glaring errors, which are only discovered when an expert in the field […] gets a glance at them", noting that "books are not subject to peer review". There are data to show that married people report happier marriages when their spouse is present during the survey interview.

Dolan retracted his erroneous statement stemming from the “spouse present” misunderstanding, acknowledged it in a published response, and notified The Guardian, which published a correction. In addition to this, he informed his editor so that the book could be revised. In his response, Dolan toned down his claims significantly but maintained that "it still seems fair to say that men benefit more from marriage than women," adding that he respects that "other people can reach a different conclusion" from the evidence base. Dolan had previously said, "We do have some good longitudinal data following the same people over time, but I am going to do a massive disservice to that science and just say: if you're a man, you should probably get married; if you're a woman, don't bother."

Debate continued after Dolan's response, with a report by The Globe and Mail stating that Dolan's "most incendiary claims were based on a misreading of data." Later press focussed on the portions of the book about resilience.

== Personal life ==
In a profile of Dolan published in The Guardian on 22 November 2014, Dolan is quoted as saying:

I have never read a novel in my life. There are only so many hours in the day and I have decided to fill them with activities other than reading made-up stories. Each to their own, eh?

Dolan was the first in his family to go to university and grew up on a council estate in Hackney. One of his hobbies is bodybuilding. He is a lifelong fan of West Ham United.

== Awards ==
In 2002, Dolan won the Philip Leverhulme Prize in economics for his contribution to health economics; in particular, for his work on QALYs (quality adjusted life years).

== Selected bibliography ==
=== Books ===
- Dolan, Paul; Olsen, Jan Abel (2002). Distributing health care: economic and ethical issues. Oxford New York: Oxford University Press. ISBN 9780192632531.
- Dolan, Paul (2014). Happiness by design: change what you do, not how you think. New York: Hudson Street Press. ISBN 9781594632433.
- Dolan, Paul (2019). Happy Ever After: Escaping The Myth of The Perfect Life. London: Allen Lane. ISBN 9780241284445.
- Dolan, Paul (2025). Beliefism. London: Bridge Street Press. ISBN 9780349128696.

=== Journal articles ===
- Anand, Paul; Dolan, Paul (January 2005). "Equity, capabilities and health". Social Science & Medicine. 60 (2): 219–222. doi:10.1016/j.socscimed.2004.04.031. PMID 15522479.
- Dolan, Paul (1997). "Modeling Valuations for EuroQol Health States". Medical Care. 35 (11): 1095–1108. doi:10.1097/00005650-199711000-00002. JSTOR 3767472. PMID 9366889.
- Dolan, Paul; Peasgood, Tessa; White, Mathew (February 2008). "Do we really know what makes us happy? A review of the economic literature on the factors associated with subjective well-being". Journal of Economic Psychology. 29 (1): 94–122. doi:10.1016/j.joep.2007.09.001.
- Dolan, Paul; Hallsworth, Michael; Halpern, David; King, Dominic; Vlaev, Ivo (2010). "Mindspace: influencing behaviour for public policy" (PDF). Institute for Government. Archived from the original (PDF) on 14 April 2010.
- Kind, P.; Dolan, P.; Gudex, C.; Williams, A. (7 March 1998). "Variations in population health status: results from a United Kingdom national questionnaire survey". BMJ. 316 (7133): 736–741. doi:10.1136/bmj.316.7133.736. PMC 28477. PMID 9529408.
- Dolan, Paul; Layard, Richard; Metcalfe, Robert (February 2011). "Measuring subjective well-being for public policy". Office for National Statistics.
- Dolan, Paul; White, Mathew P. (March 2007). "How Can Measures of Subjective Well-Being Be Used to Inform Public Policy?". Perspectives on Psychological Science. 2 (1): 71–85. doi:10.1111/j.1745-6916.2007.00030.x. PMID 26151920. S2CID 205908053.

=== Papers ===
- Dolan, Paul; Metcalfe, Robert (October 2008), Comparing willingness-to-pay and subjective well-being in the context of non-market goods - CEP discussion paper no. 890 (PDF), Center for Economic Performance.
