= Roel Vertegaal =

- Born: July 13, 1968 (age 58); Hazerswoude-Rijndijk, Netherlands
- Education: Utrecht School of the Arts; Utrecht University; Bradford University; Twente University
- Known for: Attentive User Interface; Organic User Interface; Eye Contact Sensor; Flexible Computer; Paper Computer
- Scientific career
- Fields: Computer Science and Design
- Workplaces: Radboud University; Utrecht School of the Arts; Twente University; Queen's University; Xuuk, Inc.

Roeland "Roel" Vertegaal (born July 13, 1968) is a Dutch-Canadian interaction designer, scientist, musician and entrepreneur working in the area of Human-Computer Interaction. He is best known for his work on flexible and paper computers, with systems such as PaperWindows (2004), PaperPhone (2010) and PaperTab (2012).
