= Scrivener (software) =

Word processor and outliner

- Original author: Keith Blount
- Developers: Literature & Latte
- Initial release: January 20, 2007; 18 years ago
- Stable release: macOS 3.5.0 / 1 October 2025; 49 days ago iOS 1.2.4 / 20 September 2023; 2 years ago Windows 3.1.6 / 3 September 2025; 2 months ago
- Preview release: Linux 1.9.0.1 (abandoned)
- Operating system: macOS; Windows; iOS; Linux (beta, abandoned)
- Type: Text editor; personal information manager
- License: Proprietary (shareware)
- Website: www.literatureandlatte.com/scrivener

Scrivener (/ˈskrɪvənər/) is a word-processing program and outliner designed for writers. Scrivener provides a management system for documents, notes and metadata. This allows the user to organize notes, concepts, research, and whole documents for easy access and reference (documents including rich text, images, PDF, audio, video, and web pages). Scrivener offers templates for screenplays, fiction, and non-fiction manuscripts. After writing a text, the user may export it for final formatting to a standard word processor, screenwriting software, desktop publishing software, or TeX.

== Features ==
Features include a corkboard, the ability to rearrange files by dragging-and-dropping virtual index cards on the corkboard, an outliner, a split screen mode that enables users to edit several documents at once, a full-screen mode, the ability to export text into multiple document formats (including popular e-book formats like EPUB and Mobipocket for Kindle, and markup languages such as Fountain, HTML, and MultiMarkdown), the ability to assign multiple keywords (and other metadata) to parts of a text and to sort the parts by keyword (such as characters, locations, themes, narrative lines, etc.), hyperlinks between parts of a text, and "snapshots" (the ability to save a copy of a particular document prior to any drastic changes).

Scrivener allows photos, URLs, and multiple other file formats, to be dragged into its interface as well. Because of its breadth of interfaces and features, it has positioned itself not only as a word processor, but as a project management tool for writers, and includes many user-interface features that resemble Xcode, Apple's integrated development environment (IDE).

== Platforms ==
Keith Blount created, and continues to maintain, the program as a tool to help him write the "big novel", allowing him to keep track of ideas and research. It is built mostly on libraries and features of Mac OS X from version 10.4 onward. In 2011, a Windows version of the software was released, written and maintained by Lee Powell.

=== iOS ===
Scrivener for iOS was launched July 20, 2016. The current version is 1.2.4 and requires iOS 11+.

=== Linux ===
There is no official release for Linux; there is a public beta version which has been abandoned, but still is available to use. Another option is to use the Appimage version, available for most distros.

=== Macintosh ===
The latest version of Scrivener for Mac is version 3.5.0, and requires macOS Big Sur or newer. Scrivener can be obtained from the Mac App Store, but since the Mac App Store application is only usable on OS X 10.6.6 and later, users of earlier versions of OS X must buy it directly from the developer's website instead of the Mac App Store.

The company also makes Scrivener 2.5 available for earlier version of Mac OS X, but claims it is the final version of the software that was built to run on both PowerPC and Intel systems running Mac OS X 10.4 through 10.8. This version is available on the direct sale page in the sidebar titled "Mac OS X 10.4–8 and PowerPC".

In addition to the Scrivener version 2 releases, the direct download page provides access to the obsolete version 1.54, but licenses are no longer available for purchase. The 1.54 release is compatible with Mac OS X versions 10.4 through 10.6.

=== Windows ===
The latest stable version of Scrivener for Windows is 3.1.6 This upgrade "[r]equires 64-bit Windows 10+ with .NET Framework 4.6.2+, and a minimum display resolution of 1024x768px" according to Literature & Latte's website. Those who bought Scrivener 1 on or later than 20th November 2017 qualify for a free upgrade. Those who bought Scrivener 1 before that date qualify for a 49% discount.

== See also ==
- Calibre (software)
- Comparison of text editors
- List of text editors
- Sigil (application)
- Storyist
- yWriter
- FocusWriter
- Wonderpen
