= Fountain (markup language) =

Markup language for writing screenplays

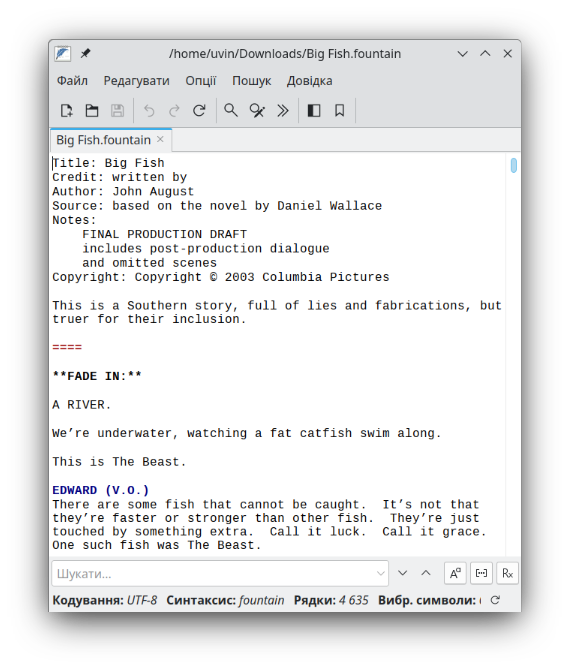
The screenplay of Big Fish (2003) written using fountain

Fountain is a free and open-source plain text markup language that makes it possible to write a formatted screenplay in any text editor, on any device, using any software that edits text files.

Fountain (which got its name from Fountain Avenue, the famous Hollywood shortcut) was inspired by John Gruber's Markdown, and has its origins in two different and non-related projects: Scrippets, developed by John August and Nima Yousefi, and Screenplay Markdown, developed by Stu Maschwitz.

== History ==
In 2004, screenwriter John August was looking for a Markdown-like syntax for formatting text documents into screenplay form. In 2008, he and Yousefi released Scrippets, a plug-in for WordPress and other platforms that allowed users to embed short sections of a screenplay in blog posts and forums, using formatting hinted from plain text.

At the same time, Maschwitz, software director of Red Giant Software and co-founder of The Orphanage, was working on a similar but more extensive project, Screenplay Markdown, that allowed plain text to be interpreted into a screenplay format.

When August and Maschwitz realized they were both working on similar text-based screenplay formats, they decided to merge their projects, and the result was Fountain.

== Implementations ==
Fountain has since been implemented in several popular text editors, word processors and screenwriting applications, such as BBEdit, Emacs, JotterPad, Scrivener, Slugline, Storyist, Sublime Text, TextWrangler, Trelby, Vim, Visual Studio Code, Writer and many others.

== See also ==
- Lightweight markup language
- List of markup languages
