= Lector =

Lector is Latin for one who reads, whether aloud or not. Lector or lektor may refer to:

- Lector (software), an e-book reader
- Reader (liturgy), a reader from scriptures during Christian religious services
- Various academic ranks, including:
  - lector or lektor, a foreign-language equivalent of lecturer or assistant professor
  - Lector jubilate, roughly equivalent to Doctor of Divinity
  - Lektor, among academic ranks in Denmark
  - Lektor, among academic ranks in Sweden
- Lector (cigar manufacture), an employee paid to entertain cigarette factory workers by reading
- A voice-over translator, known as a lektor in Poland
- Lektor, a fictional Soviet cryptographic device in the James Bond film From Russia with Love
