= Harmathèque =

Harmathèque is an online multimedia portal which contains a substantial collection of digitised books, articles, films and audio files in the French language.

The site was founded in 2009 by Denis and Xavier Pryen. As of 2013, it contained more than 26,000 ebooks, 17,000 articles, 400 films, and 600 audio files in a range of fields from the humanities to the sciences, with much of the content coming from publishers such as L'Harmattan, Pagala, Odin, and IXE. Publications are generally no older than 1975, in subjects which include psychology, economics, management, education, fine arts, law, sociology, ethnology, history, geography and linguistics.

The interface is in French, and divides the ebooks by subject into "browsable bouquets". The digitised books can then be read online using Adobe Flash and clicked through, page by page, or downloaded and read using the Adobe Digital Editions reader.

A number of major educational institutions have a subscription to site, including the University of California Berkeley, and the University of Michigan.
