= The Slow Professor =

Book by Maggie Berg and Barbara K. Seeber

- Author: Maggie Berg, Barbara K. Seeber
- Language: English
- Genre: Non-fiction
- Publisher: University of Toronto Press
- Publication date: 2016
- Publication place: Canada
- ISBN: 9781442645561

The Slow Professor: Challenging the Culture of Speed in the Academy (cloth ISBN 9781442645561; paper ISBN 9781487521851; EPUB e-book ISBN 9781442663107) is a book by Maggie Berg and Barbara K. Seeber published by University of Toronto Press. The authors challenge the haste in modern universities caused by their corporatization.
