= ACSM =

ACSM may refer to:

- Academy Sergeant Major (AcSM), the senior warrant officer at the Royal Military Academy Sandhurst
- Accumulated Campaign Service Medal
- Adobe Content Server Manager, a file format used with Adobe Digital Editions to provide digital rights management for e-books
- American College of Sports Medicine
- American Congress on Surveying and Mapping
- Associateship of the Camborne School of Mines, a British mining qualification
