= StoryBoard Quick =

StoryBoard Quick Award-winning storyboarding software
- Developer: PowerProduction Software
- Stable release: v.6.2 / Feb 2018
- Operating system: Mac OS X, Microsoft Windows 10, 8, 7, and Vista]]
- Type: Storyboard software, computer graphics, page layout, graphic organizer
- License: Proprietary
- Website: Homepage

StoryBoard Quick is a storyboarding software application for creating and editing digital storyboards for non-graphic artists and for creating rapid comp boards. No drawing necessary. Used primarily in the film and TV industry by film directors, producers, writers, commercial production companies and educators to produce a visual layout of media projects for communicating with crews, producers and/or clients before commencing the main production process.

== History ==
StoryBoard Quick v1.0 was the first vertical market storyboarding application created for filmmakers on the Mac OS. It combined features of page layout, text entry, layered-image manipulation and integrated artwork. It was introduced at ShowBiz Expo in 1993 in Los Angeles, and released at Macworld Conference & Expo in 1994 in San Francisco. A Microsoft Windows version followed in 1995. StoryBoard Quick is published and supported by PowerProduction Software. Co-founded by Paul Clatworthy and Sally Ann Walsh, the company is privately owned and located in Los Gatos, California.

== Use and features ==
StoryBoard Quick is used to plan spatial relationships between characters and props within their locations in shots and scenes using built-in 2D storyboard (multi-angle rotatable characters, colorizable props, location backgrounds) graphics (and/or combining with imported digital art or photos). StoryBoard Quick also facilitates the planning process when starting from a screenplay with features enabling the importing of scripts (from screenplay applications like Final Draft, Movie Magic Screenwriter, Storyist, Montage and others) using import wizards. StoryBoard Quick offers numerous pre-formatted professional storyboarding templates for printing or distributing boards, along with exports formats for continuing the digital workflow into editing software or Internet distribution (HTML or SWF).
