= Kitabu =

MacOS software for epub reading

- KITABU
- Initial release: February 20, 2012; 14 years ago
- Stable release: 1.2 / March 25, 2018; 7 years ago
- Operating system: macOS
- Type: EPUB reader
- License: Freeware
- Website: www.kitabu.me

Kitabu is an EPUB reading application for macOS, released in 2012.

== Features ==
- Library management
- Table of Contents
- Additional options: Text Size, Color
- Mouse & Trackpad gestures support
- Multiselection in Library view
- E-book library in two views
- Book pane selection. Book can be displayed in one, two, or three panes
- Font and background selection
- Fixed Layout
- Quick Look plugin that previews ePub file metadata directly from the Finder
