= Adobe Digital Editions =

E-book reader software

- Adobe Digital Editions 1.0, library view
- Developer: Adobe
- Stable release: 4.5.12 / 11 April 2023; 3 years ago
- Operating system: Android, Windows, iOS, macOS
- Type: E-book reader software
- License: Freeware
- Website: www.adobe.com/solutions/ebook/digital-editions.html

Adobe Digital Editions (abbreviated ADE) is an e-book reader software program from Adobe. It is used for acquiring, managing, and reading e-books, digital newspapers, and other digital publications. The software supports EPUB and PDF (nonproprietary file format for reflowable text, or fixed layout e-books; respectively). It implements a proprietary scheme of digital rights management (DRM) which, since the version 1.5 release in May 2008, allows document sharing among multiple devices and user authentication via an Adobe ID. Digital Editions is a successor to the Acrobat eBook Reader application.

Windows and Mac OS X versions of Adobe Digital Editions were released on 19 June 2007. The current Apple iOS version of the app has a one star and two star rating. Previous versions of the software required version 9.0 of Adobe Flash Player. Starting with version 2.0, however, which relies on .NET Framework 3.5 on Windows, Flash Player is no longer supported. Adobe initiated development of a Linux version of ADE in 2007; however, this has not had any beta release or any formal updates.

As of July 2025, Adobe transferred the support and future development of Adobe Digital Editions to an external company, Wipro Engineering – Connected Services. Sign-ins are now handled by ByteBooks Digital Editions.

== Digital rights management ==
Adobe Digital Editions uses the proprietary ADEPT (Adobe Digital Experience Protection Technology) digital rights management scheme, which is also implemented on some e-book readers, including iPads and many Android devices, but not Kindles. The software locks content to up to six machines and allows the user to view the content on each of them. Barnes & Noble (B&N) e-books are protected with a variant of ADEPT.

In March 2009, the author of the reverse engineering blog i♥cabbages announced that they had broken the scheme.

When viewing an e-book, Adobe Digital Editions by default stores the e-book locally as PDF files on Windows machines. These files can be copied and handled like other files, but they cannot be opened except with Adobe Digital Editions. Adobe's website has virtually no information on ADEPT except on its trademark page and a statement that OverDrive is compatible.

== Data collection concern ==
On 6 October 2014, Nate Hoffelder reported in The Digital Reader that Adobe Digital Editions version 4 ("ADE4") was sending extensive information about e-books back to Adobe, including e-books read by a user as well as e-books stored on the same machine but not opened in ADE4. This was confirmed by Sean Gallagher, writing in Ars Technica and by others. However, no one else has confirmed the report that books never opened in ADE nor in the ADE library are logged. Hoffelder reported that the information collected included "[which] ebooks that have been opened, which pages were read, and in what order... including the title, publisher, and other metadata for the book". He also reported that all this data was sent in clear text—that is, not protected by any form of encryption. This would make it easy for a third party to read this information. This data was collected for borrowed library books and for books NOT protected by any form of DRM. Hoffelder suggested that such a practice might violate various privacy laws. The Electronic Frontier Foundation (EFF) made a similar suggestion.

Adobe responded that their practice was justified by their license agreement and denied collecting data on any book not currently opened for reading. Specifically, they stated:

"All information collected from the user is collected solely for purposes such as license validation and to facilitate the implementation of different licensing models by publishers. Additionally, this information is solely collected for the eBook currently being read by the user and not for any other eBook in the user’s library or read/available in any other reader. User privacy is very important to Adobe, and all data collection in Adobe Digital Editions is in line with the end user license agreement and the Adobe Privacy Policy."

Gary Price, writing in INFOdocket (an online publication sponsored by Library Journal), views the matter as of serious concern, but sees it as another instance of concerns that have been present but largely unaddressed for years. The article also posts Adobe's response to the issue.

In October 2014, Adobe released version 4.0.1 of the software, which sends data to Adobe in a secure transmission (using HTTPS).

== See also ==
- Adobe Content Server
- calibre (software)
- Digital library
- International Digital Publishing Forum
- OverDrive Media Console
- Public library
- Sigil (application)
