= JotterPad =

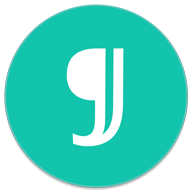
- Developer(s): Two App Studio Pte. Ltd.
- Written in: Java (programming language)
- Operating system: Android (operating system)
- License: Proprietary software
- Website: jotterpad.app

JotterPad is a text editor app for Android, developed by Two App Studio. It is proprietary software that uses the freemium pricing strategy.

== Features ==
Jotterpad supports the markdown and fountain markup languages. Among its features are themes, synchronisation with Google Drive and Dropbox, dictionary and thesaurus, and snapshots.

JotterPad uses a freemium pricing model, which means that a restricted version of the app is offered for free, while access to additional functionality requires payment. About half of the features are available in the free version. The synchronisation feature was originally limited to one account, and in Jotterpad 12 the option to synchronise using multiple accounts was added as a monthly subscription service.
