= Playwrite (software) =

Desktop publishing software

- Developer: Wundr
- Operating system: OS X
- Type: Word processor / Page layout
- License: Proprietary
- Website: Playwrite

Playwrite is an EPUB-based desktop publishing application developed by Wundr. It runs on Mac OS X 10.8 (Mountain Lion) or later. Playwrite can import HTML and plain text files. Playwrite is the only desktop publishing software which uses EPUB as the native file type.

== Features ==
Playwrite's has the following main features:

- Responsive e-books (design once, work on tablets, smartphones, and other devices)
- WYSIWYG editing
- Automatic table of contents (multi-level)
- Spelling and grammar checker (multi-language)
- Supports drag and drop of video, audio, and images
- Variety of templates in different genres (textbooks, novels, academic journals...)
- Font and color schemes to easily update the look and feel of your content
- Intuitive user-interface
