= DTBook =

DTBook (an acronym for DAISY Digital Talking Book) or DAISY XML is a XML-based document file format. It is used in EPUB 2.0 e-books and DAISY Digital Talking Book, as well as other places. Unlike other document file formats such as ODF DTBook puts a strong emphasis on structural encoding, but in comparison to other structural file formats such as DocBook and TEI it is fairly simple.

DTBook was developed by the Daisy Consortium as an accessible file format similar to HTML, with special regard to the requirements of the visually impaired. Therefore, it puts an emphasis on a clear, precise navigation and the explanation of visual elements.

DTBook is further developed by the Daisy Consortium and is defined with a DTD as part of the NISO standard Z39.86-2005

== NIMAS ==
NIMAS (National Instructional Materials Accessibility Standard) – a U.S. standard for electronic books for the visually impaired – defines a subset of DTBook XML elements. NIMAS documents are valid according to the DTBook DTD.

== Example ==
  <?xml version="1.0" encoding="UTF-8"?>
  <!DOCTYPE dtbook
  PUBLIC "-//NISO//DTD dtbook 2005-3//EN" 
  "http://www.daisy.org/z3986/2005/dtbook-2005-3.dtd">
  <dtbook version="2005-3" xml:lang="de-DE">
    <head>
      <meta name="dc:Title" content="Hello World"/>
    </head>
    <book>
      <bodymatter>
        <level1>
          <h1>Hello World</h1>
          <p>This is an example.</p>
        </level1>
      </bodymatter>
    </book>
  </dtbook>
