= Storyist =

Screenwriting software

- Developer(s): Storyist Software
- Stable release: 4.2.5 Mac OS X, 4.3 iOS / January 5, 2022
- Operating system: Mac OS X, iOS
- Platform: Macintosh, iPad
- Type: Screenwriting software
- License: Proprietary
- Website: Storyist Website

Storyist is a creative writing application for macOS X and iPad. As a product for novelists and screenwriters, it includes a word processor, an outliner, a project manager, and a cork board with support for index cards and photos.

== Features ==
=== Word processing ===
- Support for comments, images, headers, footers, style sheets, 2-up editing, and mirrored pages.
- Automatic manuscript and screenplay formatting.
- Text inspector for quick editing of formatting, style, and page settings.
- Style sheets support formatted manuscripts and screenplays.
- Support for comments, bookmarks, and Wiki links.
- Automator action-based text plugins that extend application functionality.
- Full-screen editing mode.

=== Story development ===
- Cork board with support for photos and index cards.
- Collage view to visualize the relationships between story elements.
- Color-coding outliner.
- Customizable plot, character, and setting sheets.
- Story organization and tracking of plot, character, and settings.

=== Project management ===
- Project view to keep all project-related writing organized and accessible.
- Import and export support for popular file formats, including RTF, .doc, .docx, HTML, and Final Draft.
- Automator workflow support to handle routine import and export tasks like smart quote conversion and style replacement.
- Export ePub-formatted eBooks.
- Synchronization between Mac and iPad via Dropbox.
- Supports storing in 3rd-party cloud.

== See also ==
- Screenwriting software
- Scrivener (software)
