= Snapplify =

Educational technology company

- Industry: Educational technology
- Founded: 2011
- Headquarters: Cape Town, Johannesburg, Nairobi
- Services: Software, e-learning, digital education content, related educational services, devices
- Website: www.snapplify.com

Snapplify is an educational technology company. It was founded by Wesley Lynch in 2011 in South Africa. The business has expanded into Africa, Europe and the United States, with offices across South Africa, as well as in UK, Nairobi and Amsterdam.

== History ==
Snapplify was launched at the Frankfurt Book Fair in October 2011, as a subsidiary of Realm Digital. The company secured a number of global partnerships, working with brands such as Random House, Popular Mechanics, Rolling Stone, Ramsay Media, and First National Bank (FNB).

In 2015, South African venture capital firm AngelHub, backed by former First National Bank CEO Michael Jordaan and RMB co-founder Paul Harris’ family, announced that it had invested in Snapplify. In 2016, Snapplify raised expansion capital from existing funder AngelHub Ventures, as well as new backers from South Africa and the UK to enable the company's continued growth into new markets in Africa.

In 2019, Snapplify secured $2 million expansion capital from venture capital firm Knife Capital, and empowered African investment manager Hlayisani Capital's Hlayisani Growth Fund. In early 2019, Snapplify released basic Engage – a free version of their Engage e-learning platform. In 2020, Snapplify acquired Onnie Media, an education media hub for teachers and the hub's online marketplace for teachers in South Africa, Teacha!

== Recognition ==
Snapplify received the UNESCO King Sejong Literacy Prize in 2023 for its Africa e-Library project, which promotes mother-tongue literacy across the continent.

== Community initiatives ==
The Snapplify Foundation established to increase access to digital education, has partnered with organisations like iSchoolAfrica and mountaineer Saray Khumalo to set up digital libraries in disadvantaged schools across South Africa's nine provinces. The Snapplify Foundation operates several programmes designed to support both educators and learners. This includes Learner Programmes, Teacher Programmes, ICT Interventions, and Bursary Support.
