= Trelby =

Free, multiplatform, feature-rich screenwriting program

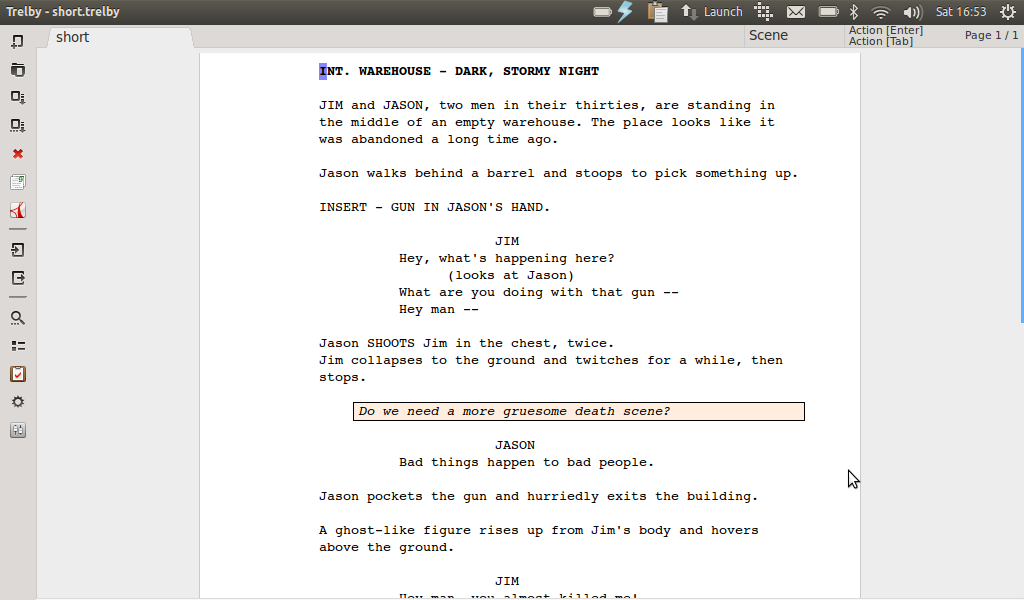
- Trelby on Ubuntu
- Stable release: 2.4.10 / September 9, 2024; 13 months ago
- Repository: github.com/trelby/trelby
- Written in: Python
- Operating system: Windows and Linux
- Type: Screenwriting software
- License: GPL
- Website: trelby.org

Trelby is a free and open source screenwriting program which focuses on providing a simple, uncluttered interface to writing screenplays. It is a rebranding of an older screenwriting program called Blyte. It currently runs on both Windows and Linux platforms.

== History ==
Blyte was a proprietary screenwriting program written by Osku Salerma in 2003, and was maintained as such until 2006, when lacklustre sales led to work on the program being stopped. The code was open sourced under the GPL.

The code lay dormant until late 2011, when it was re-discovered by Anil Gulecha, who along with Salerma started working on the program again for wider release. Blyte was renamed to Trelby, and several new features were added.

As of 2024, Trelby is currently available on GitHub.
