= Lector (software) =

E-book reading software

- Release: November 2017
- Stable release: 0.5.1 / 9 March 2019
- Written in: Python, Qt
- Operating system: Linux
- Available in: 8 languages
- List of languages Chinese, Czech, French, German, Japanese, Portuguese, Russian, Spanish
- License: GPL-3.0-or-later
- Website: github.com/BasioMeusPuga/Lector
- Repository: github.com/BasioMeusPuga/Lector

Lector is a free e-book reading application for desktop Linux systems that also has basic collection management features.

== History ==
Lector was developed by a Spanish programmer known as BasioMeusPuga He started publishing code on GitHub in November 2017. and released on March 10, 2018.

Initially there was no support for annotations or text highlighting, neither for PDF files. Preliminary PDF support via Poppler was released in spring 2018 in version 0.2.

== Features ==
It deals with both popular e-book formats and comic books: EPUB, Mobipocket, AZW(3/4), comic book archive (CBR/CBZ), Portable Document Format (PDF), DjVu, FictionBook (FB2) It does not support files with digital rights management.

Lector opens to an overview of the book collection ("library"), which can be sorted by the content of different metadata fields or last reading time and can search/filter titles. It can be configured as an array of book cover thumbnails or as a simple table. A book metadata editor is available via the context menu.

The reading view has a distraction-free mode, saves the reading position and offers zoom controls, full-text search, text annotations and an integrated dictionary. Text rendering (font, size, spacing) and page color can be configured. It can save several configuration profiles, switch between them and export them. Bookmarks can be organized via a sidebar.

== Distribution ==
Lector is released as Free Software, and thus with its complete source code, under the terms of the GNU General Public License in version 3 or later on GitHub. It has been included in the default package repositories of Arch (AUR), openSUSE and Gentoo.

== Technology ==
The application is written in Python, using Qt 5 widgets via PyQt for the user interface. Given a folder with e-books, it indexes them in place. Metadata and cover images are stored in a SQLite database.

== Sources ==
- Okoi, Martins Divine (2018-03-22). "Lector – A Qt Based eBook Reader for Linux". FOSSMint.
- Sneddon, Joey (2018-03-16). "This Qt eBook App for Linux is a Real Page Turner". OMG! Ubuntu!.
