= Calibre (software) =

E-book management and editing software

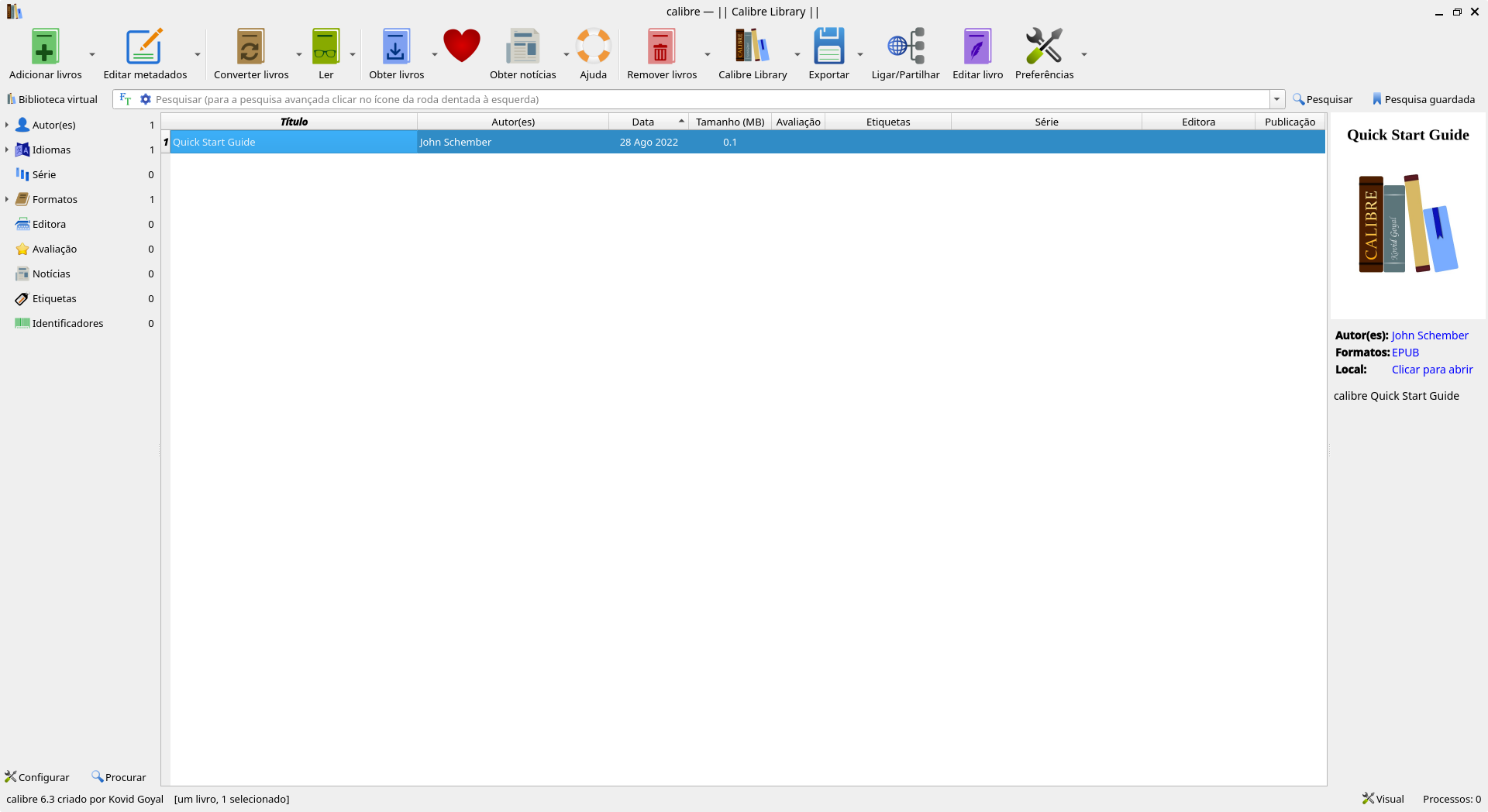
- Calibre 6.3 in Linux
- Original author: Kovid Goyal
- Release: 31 October 2006; 20 years ago
- Stable release: 9.17.0 / 23 October 2026
- Written in: Python, C++, C
- Operating system: Windows, macOS, Linux
- Platform: IA-32, x64
- Type: E-book reader, word processor
- License: GPL-3.0-only
- Website: calibre-ebook.com
- Repository: github.com/kovidgoyal/calibre

Calibre (/ˈkælɪbər/ KAL-ih-bər) is a cross-platform free and open-source suite of e-book software. Calibre supports organizing existing e-books into virtual libraries, displaying, editing, creating and converting e-books, as well as syncing e-books with a variety of e-readers. Calibre has a large collection of community contributed plugins.

== History ==
On 31 October 2006, when Sony introduced its PRS-500 e-reader, Kovid Goyal started developing libprs500, aiming mainly to enable use of the PRS-500 formats on Linux. With support from the MobileRead forums, Goyal reverse-engineered the proprietary Broad Band eBook (BBeB) file format. In 2008, the program, for which a graphical user interface was developed, was renamed "calibre", displayed in all lowercase.

In 2025, starting with version 8.11.1, Goyal began integrating large language models into Calibre. Supported platforms include Google, GitHub, OpenRouter, Ollama, and LM Studio.

== Features ==
Calibre supports many file formats and reading devices. Most e-book formats can be edited, for example, by changing the font, font size, margins, and metadata, and by adding an auto-generated table of contents. Appropriately licensed digital books can be directly converted and edited, but commercially purchased e-books may need to have digital rights management (DRM) restrictions removed first. Calibre does not natively support DRM removal, but may enable DRM removal after installing plug-ins.

Calibre enables users to sort and group e-books by metadata fields. Metadata can be pulled from many different sources, e.g. ISBNdb.com; online booksellers; and providers of free e-books and periodicals, such as the Internet Archive, Munsey's Magazine, and Project Gutenberg; and social networking sites for readers, such as Goodreads and LibraryThing. It is possible to search the Calibre library by various fields, such as author, title, or keyword. Full text search is available from Calibre 6.0 onwards.

E-books can be imported into the Calibre library, either by sideloading files manually or by wirelessly syncing an e-book reading device with the cloud storage service in which the Calibre library is backed up, or with the computer on which Calibre resides. Also, online content can be harvested and converted to e-books. This conversion is facilitated by so-called recipes, short programs written in a Python-based domain-specific language. E-books can then be exported to all supported reading devices via USB, Calibre's integrated mail server, or wirelessly. Mailing e-books enables, for example, sending personal documents to the Amazon Kindle family of e-readers and tablet computers.

This can be accomplished via a web browser, if the host computer is running and the device and host computer share the same network; in this case, pushing harvested content from content sources is supported on a regular interval (called 'subscription'). Also, if the Calibre library on the host computer is stored in a cloud service, such as Box.net, Google Drive, or Dropbox, then either the cloud service or a third-party app, such as Calibre Cloud or CalibreBox, can remotely access the library.

Since version 1.15, released in December 2013, Calibre also contains an application to create and edit e-books directly, similar to the more full-featured editor tools of the Sigil application, but without the latter's WYSIWYG editing mode.

== Associated apps ==
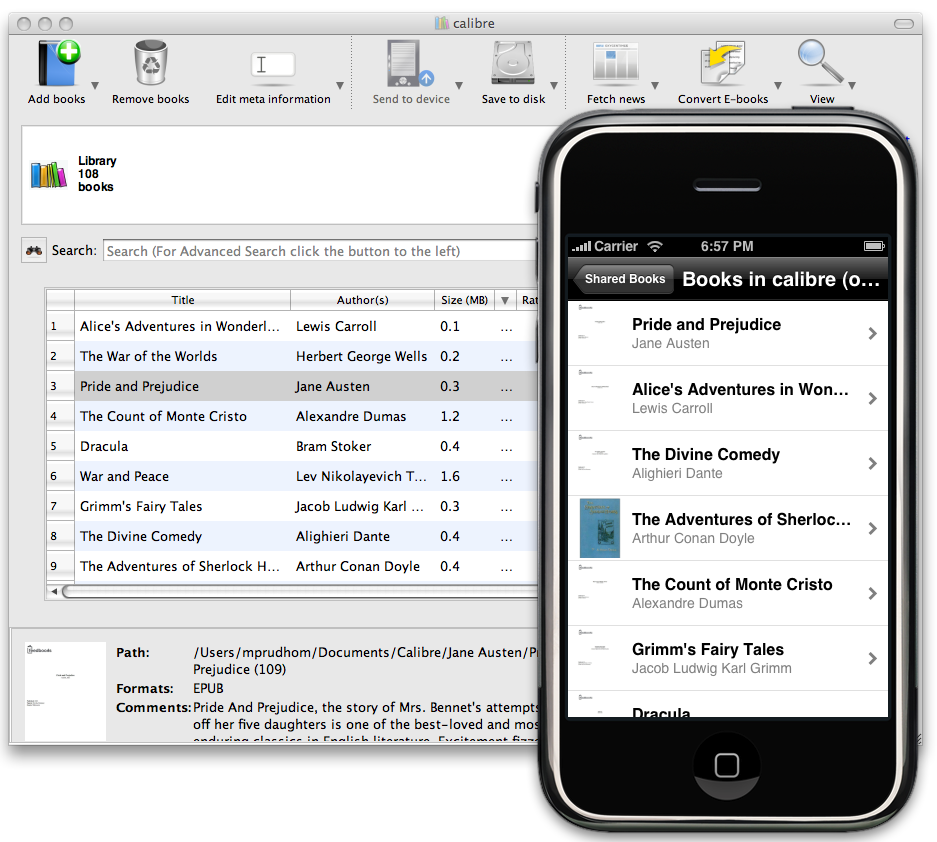
Synchronizing Calibre with an iPhone

- Calibre Cloud (free) and Calibre Cloud Pro (paid), apps by Intrepid Logic that let one "access your Calibre e-book library from anywhere in the world. Place your calibre library in your Dropbox, Box, or Google Drive folder, and be able to view, search, and download from your library anywhere". As Jane Litte at Dear Author and John Jeremy at Teleread observe: This tool can be used to "create [one's] own Cloud of eBooks" and thereby read and allow downloads and emails from one's Calibre library via the Calibre folder in Box.net, Dropbox, or Google Drive. Because the Calibre-generated local wireless feed (OPDS) can only be accessed on devices sharing the same network as the Calibre library, this feature of the Calibre Cloud apps is particularly useful when away from one's home network, because it allows one to download and read the contents of one's Calibre library via the Calibre folder in Box, Dropbox, or Google Drive.
- Calibre Companion (paid), an app by MultiPie, Ltd. Was recommended by calibre's developers, "brings complete integration with calibre on your desktop, giving you total control over book management on your device." John Jermey at Teleread notes this app can manage Calibre/device libraries as if one's mobile device were plugged into computer; however, unlike Calibre Cloud, Calibre Companion requires users to be at a computer and use the Calibre-generated local wireless feed (OPDS).
- Calibre Library (paid), an app by Tony Maro that allows one to "Connect wirelessly to your Calibre e-book library or other Stanza source. Browse and download your e-books on the go." This app's operations and benefits are similar to those offered by Calibre Cloud.
- Calibre Sync (free), an app by Seng Jea Lee that "seamlessly connects to your Calibre Library and shows up as a connected device on Calibre. If Auto-Connect option is enabled, your device will attempt to connect to the Calibre Library when it is within the home Wi-Fi network. This allows Calibre to automatically update your device with the latest newspaper or magazines you have scheduled for download!" As with Calibre Companion, this app requires the device to be on the same network as the Calibre library.
- CalibreBox (free and paid), an app by Eric Hoffmann that, like Calibre Cloud, accesses Calibre libraries from cloud storage. Unlike Calibre Cloud, it is limited to Dropbox, but CalibreBox supports more than one library at a time, and flexible sorting and filtering. Custom column support for the book detail view, sorting, and filtering by custom columns, and adding more than two libraries are restricted to paid users. The app is built on the design principles of Google's Material Design and is under active development.
- Calibre-go (free), app by Litlcode Studios lets you access your Calibre e-book library from cloud storage and access the library through Calibre-go to browse, sort, search and read books on your mobile. Calibre-go supports multiple libraries across multiple accounts simultaneously.
- Calibre Sync (paid), an Android app by BIL Studio that lets you access Calibre libraries from cloud storage (Dropbox, OneDrive, Box, and Cloud), or from SD card. Calibre Sync supports multiple libraries across multiple accounts simultaneously, also allows users to browse, sort, search, filter and download books to read on devices.

== See also ==
- Adobe Digital Editions
- Comparison of e-readers
- List of free and open-source software packages
- OverDrive Media Console
