= Sigil (application) =

EPUB e-book editing software

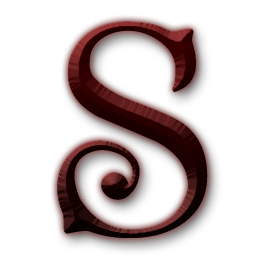

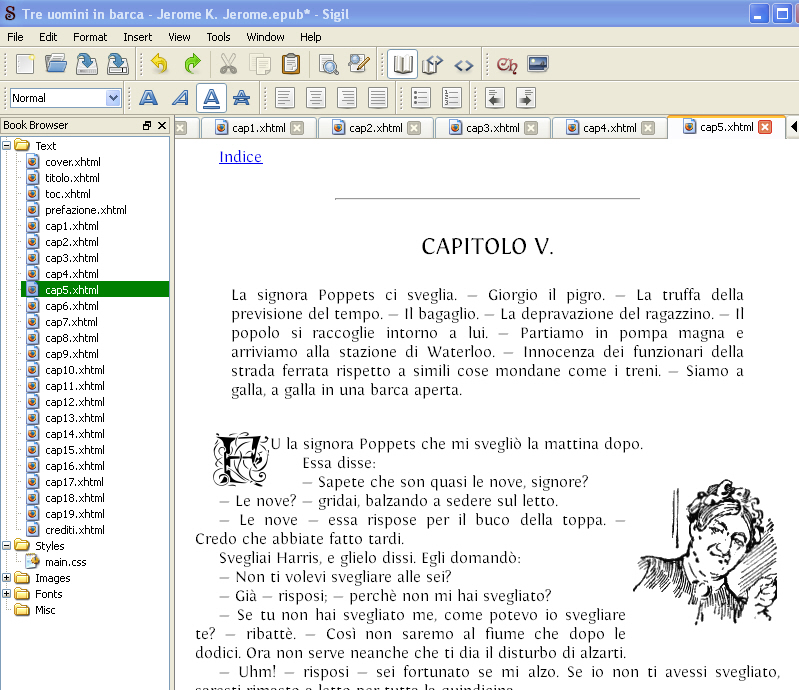
- Original author(s): Strahinja Val Marković
- Developer(s): Kevin Hendricks and Doug Massay
- Initial release: 1 August 2009; 16 years ago
- Stable release: 2.6.0 / 17 July 2025
- Repository: github.com/Sigil-Ebook/Sigil
- Written in: C++ (Qt)
- Operating system: Windows, macOS and Linux
- Available in: English
- Type: Desktop publishing software
- License: GPL-3.0-or-later
- Website: sigil-ebook.com

Sigil is free, open-source editing software for e-books in the EPUB format.

As a cross-platform application, Sigil is distributed for the Windows, macOS, Haiku and Linux platforms under the GNU GPL license. Sigil supports code-based editing of EPUB files, as well as the import of HTML and plain text files. A companion application, PageEdit, allows WYSIWYG editing of EPUB files.

Sigil has been developed by Strahinja Val Marković and others since 2009. From July 2011 to June 2015 John Schember was the lead developer. In June 2015, development of Sigil was taken over by Kevin Hendricks and Doug Massay.

== Features ==
Sigil's features include:

- Full UTF-16 and EPUB 2 specification support
- Multiple views: book, code and preview view
- Table of contents generator with multi-level heading support
- Metadata editor with full support for all metadata entries
- Hunspell based spell checking with default and user configurable dictionaries
- Full regular expression (PCRE) support for find and replace
- Supports import of EPUB and HTML files, images, and style sheets
- Integrated API to external HTML and graphics editors
- FlightCrew validator for EPUB standard compliance validation (separate plugin)

Sigil has full EPUB 2 specifications support, but only limited EPUB 3 support. Since version 0.9.3 of January 2016, the developers have been focusing on "improving Sigil’s ability to work with and generate epub3 ebooks without losing any of its epub2 capabilities".

WYSIWYG editing in book view was discontinued in 2019 and moved to a separate application, PageEdit.

== See also ==
- Calibre (software)
- List of free and open-source software packages
