= Adobe Content Server =

Ebook digital rights management software

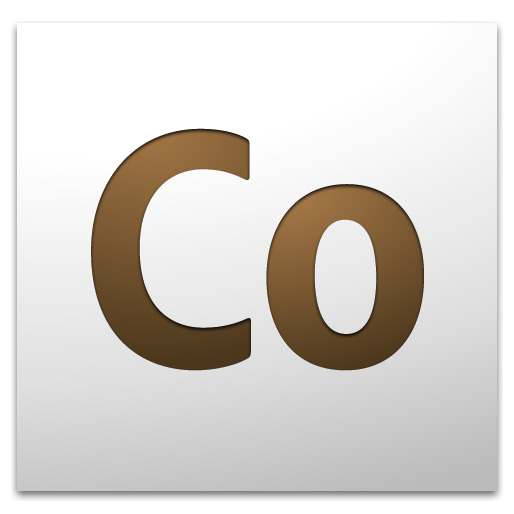
- Developer: Adobe Systems
- Stable release: 6.5 / 2015; 11 years ago
- Operating system: Cross-platform
- Type: Digital rights management, content server
- License: Adobe EULA / Proprietary
- Website: www.adobe.com/solutions/ebook/content-server.html

Adobe Content Server is software developed by Adobe Systems to add digital rights management to e-books. It is designed to protect and distribute Adobe e-books in PDF or EPUB format through Adobe Digital Editions, or applications and devices developed using Adobe's Adobe Reader Mobile SDK, covering a wide range of tablets, smartphones, and dedicated devices. Adobe Content Server also works in conjunction with Adobe Digital Experience Protection Technology (ADEPT), Adobe's digital rights management scheme.

== See also ==
- Digital library
- Public library
- Online shopping
- Publishing
- Adobe Digital Editions
