= International Digital Publishing Forum =

Trade and standards association

The International Digital Publishing Forum (IDPF) was a trade and standards association for the digital publishing industry, set up to establish a standard for electronic book publishing. It was responsible for the EPUB standard currently used by most e-readers.

Starting from the Open eBook (OEB) Publication Structure (1999), created loosely around HTML, it then defined the OPS (Open Publication Structure), the OPF (Open Packaging Format) and the OCF (Open Container Format). These formats are the basis for EPUB.

While the basic standards are established (pages, hyperlinks, definition of table of contents, authors, etc.), the hardware field intersects with some other standards, such as those for power of the hardware reader devices, and as of 2017 are still developing. Standards for ecommerce (including digital rights management) are tied to the way the ebook is sold or delivered and are therefore controlled by vendors.

On January 30, 2017, IDPF was combined with and absorbed into the World Wide Web Consortium.
