= Lia Scott Price =

American horror writer

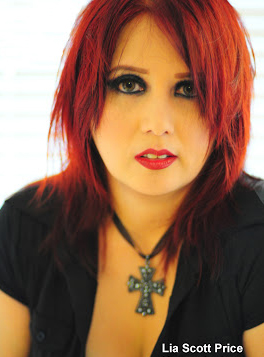
- Occupations: Author, filmmaker
- Known for: Horror fiction writing
- Website: www.liascottprice.com

Lia Scott Price is a horror fiction author and independent filmmaker. She is known for the characters Serial Killer and Vampire Guardian Angels which she created for her books and films. In addition to writing and producing, she is also the creator of the Serial Killer and Vampire Guardian Angels comic book series.

== Filmography ==
- 2012, Pra/ey: A Vampire Short
- 2011, Scenes From A Novel: The Guardian, Revenant, and Dominion Short Films
- 2010, The Serial Killer and Vampire Guardian Angel Diaries
- 2009, Horror Writing With Lia Scott Price
- 2009, Lia Scott Price’s Letters to Mother
- 2009, Lia Scott Price’s Demonic & Negative Entity Possession
- 2008, Lia Scott Price’s Dark Fiction
- 2008, Lia Scott Price’s Nightmares
- 2007, Normal, California
- 2006, The Guardian
- 2006, Dominion

== Bibliography ==
- 2009, The Guardian, Revenant, and Dominion (Horror Trilogy), CreateSpace, ISBN 1449513980
- 2009, Letters To Mother, CreateSpace, ISBN 144216459X
- 2003, Revenant, iUniverse, ISBN 0595293727
- 2003, Resurrection, iUniverse, ISBN 0595269680
- 2002, Body and Blood, iUniverse, ISBN 059524338X
- 2002, Ghostwriter, iUniverse, ISBN 059522931X
- 2002, The Guardian, iUniverse, ISBN 0595228658, Optioned as a screenplay by The Triton Film Group in 2002.
- 2000, The Frog Asylum, iUniverse, ISBN 0595155561

== Comic series ==
- 2012, Vampire Guardian Angels, Volume 1 – 3
