= Kindle Direct Publishing =

Amazon's e-book publishing unit

- Parent company: Amazon
- Founded: November 2007; 19 years ago
- Headquarters location: Seattle, Washington, United States
- Distribution: Worldwide
- Publication types: E-books on Amazon Kindle
- Official website: kdp.amazon.com

Kindle Direct Publishing (KDP) is Amazon.com's e-book publishing platform launched in November 2007, concurrently with the first Amazon Kindle device. Originally called Digital Text Platform, the platform allows authors and publishers to publish their books to the Amazon Kindle Store.

Authors can upload documents in several formats for delivery via the KDP website and charge between $0.99 and $200.00 for their works. KDP accepts books in 44 languages.

In 2016, Amazon also added a paperback option, and in 2021, a hardback (case laminated) option, both of which use print-on-demand technology.

== History ==
Kindle Direct Publishing (KDP) was in open beta testing in late 2007. In a December 5, 2009, interview with The New York Times, Amazon CEO Jeff Bezos revealed that Amazon keeps 65% of the revenue from all e-book sales for the Kindle. The remaining 35% is split between the author and publisher. In 2010, they improved the rate from 35% to 70% to compete with Apple, provided the publisher met certain conditions.

During 2016, Amazon released four million e-books and 40% of those titles were self-published under KDP.

In April 2017, Amazon released Kindle Create, an application for converting Word and PDF files into Kindle-compatible files; before this release there were multiple Amazon apps to convert various types of files.

Total royalties paid out on Amazon KDP were over $260 million in 2018, increasing to over $300 million in 2019.

== Products and subplatforms ==
=== Kindle Scout (defunct) ===
In 2014, Amazon released the Kindle Scout platform. Aspiring authors could post their unpublished novels on Kindle Scout. Visitors could browse the categories and read the first 5,000 words of any novel, then nominate up to three books at a time for publication by Kindle Press. If chosen, the author was paid an advance on royalties and their book received a professional edit. In April 2018, Amazon stopped taking new submissions to Kindle Scout, indicating that the service would be shut down in the near future. At that time, 293 titles had been selected for publication during the program.

=== Kindle Worlds (defunct) ===
Kindle Worlds was established on May 22, 2013, to provide a commercial venue for fan fiction creations of specific licensed media properties. Amazon shut down the Kindle Worlds In August 2018.

=== Kindle Publishing for Blogs (defunct)/Periodicals ===
In early 2008, Amazon began to allow sites such as Ars Technica and TechCrunch to add their blogs to the Kindle platform, and in May 2009, the program was opened to all. Amazon, not the content publisher, set the monthly subscription and retained 70% of the revenue. The blog service was discontinued on August 19, 2019, due to low usage and was repurposed for newspapers and periodicals under the name Kindle Publishing for Periodicals.

=== KDP Select ===
The KDP Select program requires the publisher to give Amazon 100% exclusivity—the ebook may not be sold anywhere else, with minor exceptions. The author may opt out from KDP select ninety days after enrolment. If no action is taken, it will auto-renew for another ninety days. All KDP Select books are included in Kindle Unlimited, a monthly subscription service that allows unlimited reading of e-books.

Amazon initially paid authors in its KDP Select program a set fee per book, provided a reader read at least 10 percent of the book. This drew criticism from authors of longer works because a reader would have to read more of their books in order for the authors to receive any payment, while those who wrote shorter books could receive the fees more easily. In July 2015, the company changed its Kindle Select payment structure to a per-page model. Every time an author's e-book is borrowed and pages are read, the author earns a share of a monthly fund, which was $1.2 million in April 2014, $11 million in July 2015, and in 2019 $28.5 million, for a per-page rate of about half a cent.

=== Kindle Vella ===
Kindle Vella was a serial publication platform, introduced in 2021 as a competitor to Wattpad and Radish, and discontinued in February 2025. Kindle Vella initially failed to attract as much popularity as its predecessors, although initially it was applauded by technology magazines such as GeekWire for "bringing books into the TikTok era". Publishers Weekly argued that Kindle Vella's partiality to smartphone interfaces and short clips of stories would attract younger readers to genre fiction. Android Central, in contrast, criticized Vella for its lack of appeal to authors, owing largely to its "token system" and its connection with Amazon as a parent company. Android Central, despite its criticism, agreed that there was an incentive for Amazon to add Vella to its Kindle Direct Publishing platform, stating,

The idea of serialized fiction is not a new one, and this exact format and platform have been in use for many years at this point. The most commonly known example is from a Canadian company called Wattpad. Founded in 2006, Wattpad offers a platform for writers and cross-platform apps to experience and enjoy serialized storytelling. Webtoon is a comic platform built on the same concept, allowing creators to build followings and even monetize their comics by having Fast Pass episodes you can unlock with Coins for X days before they become free to read. Supporting creators directly has also been an idea that has been gaining a lot of traction over the past few years, popularized by Patreon and Substack, and even extended into other content areas by sites like OnlyFans. Large media companies like Apple and Spotify are also trying to get a piece of this action, with new creator tools and monetization options in their podcast platforms. Given this growing trend and the fact that our attention is as short and divided as ever, it certainly makes sense that Amazon wants to find additional ways to attract and retain readers to its dominant Kindle platform.

=== Hardcover publication ===
In addition to e-books and paperbacks, Kindle Direct Publishing (KDP) also offers hardcover book publication, allowing authors to publish and distribute their works in hardcover format. This option provides authors with an opportunity to reach a wider audience, cater to readers who prefer hardbound editions, and potentially enhance the perceived value of their books.

== Criticism ==
=== Data sharing and retention ===
The revenue sharing condition and the inability to opt out of the lendability feature, that was abused in the former Lendink service, have caused some controversy. Other criticisms involve the business model behind Amazon's implementation and distribution of e-books. Amazon introduced a software application allowing Kindle books to be read on an iPhone or iPod Touch, and soon followed with an application called "Kindle for PCs" that can be run on a Windows PC. Due to the book publishers' DRM policies, Amazon claims there is no right of first sale with e-books and states that, since e-books are licensed, not purchased (unlike paper books), buyers do not actually own their e-books. This claim has never been tested in court, and the outcome of any action by Amazon is uncertain. The law on these matters is in a state of flux in jurisdictions around the world.

It has also been pointed out that Kindle Direct's authors and account-holders have no ability to completely delete retired files reverted to "draft" status from Kindle Direct's databases, a similar practice that CreateSpace followed, whereby a book can be unpublished for further new printing, but will indefinitely be stored on one or more of Amazon's digital servers, even if this version is considered inferior (outdated, typos and grammatical errors, formatting problems, wrong author name or deadname, etc.) This was investigated by self-publishing help website Just Publishing Advice, which ultimately agreed, stating, "if you have self-published a book and now want to delete it, all you can do is unpublish it. The same applies if you are managing the books of a deceased self-published author. This will remove it from sale and distribution. However, it will not stop possible sales by third parties on mass-market distribution." This is confirmed by Kindle Direct Publishing itself, which not only has the account-holder click a digital box confirming agreement with its Terms & Conditions, which mentions the indefinite storage of any uploaded files on its servers, but also on Kindle Direct Publishing's Frequently Asked Questions section, where it states, "You can delete books in "Draft" status from your Bookshelf. If your book was previously published and available for sale, it can't be deleted. Also, paperbacks that were assigned an ISBN can't be deleted." Kindle Direct Publishing has never publicly disclosed why it retains unpublished files on its servers. Additionally, there is no legal protection or exceptions for minors or mentally ill and disabled individuals who happen to sign the Terms & Conditions agreement. Authors who delete their accounts, or who have their accounts deleted, continue to have any uploaded files retained by Kindle Direct Publishing, although in cases where it appears that a book has been plagiarized by another account using Kindle Direct's services, authors are prompted to contact Amazon's Legal Department, which more broadly deals with any form of copyright infringement.

=== Hate speech and misinformation ===
Kindle Direct Publishing has been criticised for hosting offensive and potentially illegal content, including hate propaganda, neo-Nazi material, autism misinformation, and illegal sex-based material (books promoting paedophilia or bestiality). Users on Reddit and 4Chan have described its quality control policy as "publishing anything" with little to no legal recourse or evaluation. Some titles released through Amazon's self-publishing platforms Kindle Direct Publishing and CreateSpace have been removed by Amazon after legal complaints, such as The Pedophile's Guide to Love and Pleasure: a Child-lover's Code of Conduct by Phillip R. Greaves, Is Greta Thunberg Just A Puppet? The truth about the the [sic] youngest ambientalist by Markus Jorgenssen, and A MAD World Order by Paul Bernardo.

In an experiment to test Amazon's quality control, Wired journalist Matthew "Matt" Reynolds penned a self-published Kindle eBook titled How To Cure Autism: A guide to using chlorine dioxide to cure autism. He explained, "to test the system, we uploaded a fake Kindle book titled How To Cure Autism: A guide to using chlorine dioxide to cure autism. The listing was approved within two hours. When creating the book, Amazon's Kindle publishing service suggested a stock cover image that made it appear as though the book had been approved by the FDA." He pointed out that a number of other real Kindle titles promoting bleach cures and other misinformation were already prevalent on Amazon.

=== Plagiarized books and piracy ===
Authors like Nora Roberts and Stephen King have had their work plagiarized and copied by users on Kindle Direct Publishing. Plagiarism, both of traditionally-published and self-published titles, has been a growing problem on Kindle Direct Publishing. These stolen titles may retain a permanent metadata record on Google Books, Goodreads and Ingram if assigned an ISBN (Kindle Direct Publishing offers authors of print books a "free KDP ISBN" option which immediately places any assigned title into Bowker and Ingram's databases), although many plagiarized titles also occur in the form of Kindle eBooks with only an ASIN and no ISBN, as this allows a higher quantity of the plagiarized title to be sold off in a short amount of time, leaving almost no trace if the plagiarist does get caught. The legal recourse affecting the plagiarist, who may use a pseudonym to publish under, is limited, moreover because Amazon's data is almost immediately imported into Ingram and Goodreads, this runs the risk of the plagiarized book's metadata overriding or superseding the original author's metadata. Having plagiarized book metadata removed from the internet is challenging; Goodreads considers plagiarized books with metadata to be valid book records and typically will not remove them, instead merging them into the author's metadata so that the plagiarist's name appears on the author's records, while Google Books requires a notice from Ingram before it will actually take down metadata for a plagiarized book imported by Ingram's data. According to author David Gaughran, who has long been campaigning against the ease of plagiarism through self-publishing platforms, "Amazon said don't worry, we have robust systems in place to prevent fraud, and it was all bullshit... it hurts authors much more than Amazon. They might see it as only affecting 0.2% of books or whatever, but the top scammers are making over $100,000 a month – money that comes from the author fund, not Amazon's end. These people gaming the system will roll a huge chunk of that back into advertising too, which either brings readers to the website, or goes directly back into Amazon's pocket via Amazon Ads." Nora Roberts, meanwhile, described Kindle Direct's system as "absurdly weak" and "enraging" to her. "This culture, this ugly underbelly of legitimate self-publishing is all about content. More, more, more, fast, fast, fast".

Amazon, in turn, has defended its minimalist approach to quality control with the argument that self-publishing companies regularly run plagiarism checks on books being uploaded, typically against other content that they already have access to. The Urban Writers argued, on Amazon's behalf, that "Amazon is extremely sensitive about plagiarized work and, if flagged, your account could be deactivated." Plagiarism Today noted that cases such as the "Cristiane Serruya Plagiarism Scandal" (a case in which a prolific Kindle Direct author was caught pulling fictional content into her books from various third-party sources) reflect a need for Amazon to be stricter in its approach to copyright infringement. The publication was critical of Amazon's lack of agency in relation to plagiarism, pointing out, "though Amazon will, sometimes, remove works that violates [sic] their terms of service after they get complaints, they’re happy to sell the books and reap the profits until they get such a notice. And, from Amazon’s perspective, this is completely legal. They are protected by the Digital Millennium Copyright Act (DMCA) as well as other laws, in particular Section 230 of the Communications Decency Act, that basically mean they are under no obligation to vet or check the works they publish. They are legally free to produce and sell books, physical and digital, regardless of whether they are plagiarized, copyright infringing or otherwise illegal." The phenomenon of plagiarized versions of books appearing on self-publishing platforms is also not totally unique to Amazon, although, as Plagiarism Today argues, Amazon's approach to plagiarism on subsidiaries Kindle Direct and Goodreads has led to an inability for authors to protect their names and reputations on the internet, not merely their financial control over their own books, due to the way in which plagiarism can impact the display and retention of book metadata.

=== Lyndon McLeod ===
In December 2021, Lyndon McLeod (aka Roman McClay) murdered 5 people in Denver and Lakewood, Colorado. McLeod detailed his plans for these attacks, including using the actual names of some of the victims, in a series of novels called Sanction that he self-published to Amazon through Kindle Direct Publishing.

=== Account termination disputes ===
KDP has been criticized for its handling of account terminations, which some authors claim occur without sufficient warning or explanation. In some reported cases, authors alleged that accounts were permanently closed over single alleged violations of the platform's terms of service, resulting in the loss of access to outstanding royalty payments and the removal of all published titles. Amazon has stated that it enforces its guidelines to maintain quality and compliance, but author advocacy groups have called for greater transparency and an appeals process.

== See also ==
- CreateSpace
- Audiobook Creation Exchange (ACX)
