= ACX =

ACX may refer to:

- ACX Technologies, Inc, a holding company wholly owned by CoorsTek
- Air Cargo Germany (ICAO airline code ACX, now defunct)
- Astral Codex Ten, the successor blog to Slate Star Codex
- Atlantic City Expressway
- Audiobook Creation Exchange, an Audible.com audiobook service
- Omani Arabic (ISO 639 language identifier acx)
- Xingyi Wanfenglin Airport in Guizhou Province, China. (IATA airport code ACX)
