= Lendink =

The website's logo

Lendink was an e-book sharing website which allows users to connect with other users who are willing to lend a copy of a certain book, utilizing the lending functionality provided by the Amazon Kindle and Barnes & Noble Nook platforms.

Lendink became notable for an incident in August 2012 where it was assumed to be an illegal file-sharing website, despite its legitimacy, leading to its temporary shutdown after the site's owner and host received hundreds of cease and desist and takedown notices.

As of June 2013, the website stopped its hosting services from GoDaddy and ceased functioning.

== History ==
In 2011 Amazon allowed authors to publish their books through Kindle Direct Publishing. It gave authors the ability to sell their books directly to consumers via the Kindle Store. An author had two royalty levels to choose from. If they published their book at the 70% royalty level, the book would be lendable. If it was published at the 35% royalty rate, an author could opt in or opt out of the feature. Lending through both providers lasted for 14 days. A book could only be lent out once.

Lendink debuted in 2011 as a virtual book club. It allowed owners of ebooks to offer their copies up to be loaned. If a person wanted to borrow a book, they would send an email through the website to the person offering a book to be borrowed. The transaction would happen via the Amazon or Barnes & Noble software. The site did not host the books and operated off of no income. It was only a facilitator of activities that were authorized by the author or publisher. If a book was not authorized to be lent by the publisher, the option would be grayed out on the site.

=== Takedown ===
At the beginning of August 2012, someone took a glance at Lendink's website and interpreted it as a file-sharing website. They proceeded to tell as many authors as they could over social networking sites such as Twitter and Facebook. The message spread quickly, passing mouth to mouth from author to author. Cease and desist letters and takedown notices started to pour into the website's internet service provider. The website was pulled after mounting legal threats which numbered in the hundreds.

Following the shutdown, a crowdfunding effort began to provide a financial base for re-opening the website. On August 24, 2012, Lendlink was officially re-opened; while the site did receive several takedown notices following the re-opening, the legitimacy of these requests was questioned.

==== Reactions ====
The takedown sparked dialogue among opinion writers. The website's critics have defended their actions based on the fact that the intellectual property owners did not directly authorize the website. Its defenders pointed out that the owners did authorize the loaning out of the ebooks and that ignorance of the terms and conditions would not exempt the authors from them. One commentator pointed out that the takedown was a direct side effect of digital rights management. They pointed out that few people would have complained if people were swapping physical copies of books.
