= Amazon Kindle =

E-book reading device or technology

- Developer: Amazon
- Manufacturer: Foxconn
- Product family: Kindle
- Type: E-reader
- Released: November 19, 2007; 19 years ago (Kindle 1)
- Introductory price: US$399; equivalent to $620 in 2025 (Kindle 1)
- Operating system: Kindle firmware, utilizing Linux kernel Latest versions: Kindle 1: 1.2.1; Kindle 2, DX: 2.5.8; Kindle Keyboard: 3.4.3; Kindle 4, 5: 4.1.4; Kindle Touch: 5.3.7.3; Kindle Paperwhite 1: 5.6.1.1; Kindle 7, Paperwhite 2: 5.12.2.2; Kindle Voyage: 5.13.6; Kindle 8; Paperwhite 3; Oasis 1, 2: 5.16.2.1.1; Kindle 10; Paperwhite 4: 5.18.1.1.1; Kindle Oasis 3: 5.18.2; Kindle 11 (2022); Paperwhite 5: 5.19.2; Kindle 11 (2024); Paperwhite 6; Colorsoft; Scribe 1, 2, 3, Colorsoft: 5.19.5
- Online services: Kindle Store
- Website: amazon.com/kindle

Amazon Kindle is a series of e-readers designed and marketed by Amazon. Amazon Kindle devices enable users to browse, buy, download, and read e-books, newspapers, magazines, Audible audiobooks, and other digital media via wireless networking to the Kindle Store. The hardware platform, which Amazon subsidiary Lab126 developed, began as a single device in 2007. Currently, it comprises a range of devices, including e-readers with E Ink electronic paper displays and Kindle applications on all major computing platforms. All Kindle devices integrate with Windows and macOS file systems and Kindle Store content and, as of March 2018, the store had over six million e-books available in the United States.

== Naming and development ==
In 2004, Amazon founder and CEO Jeff Bezos instructed the company's employees to build the world's best electronic reader before Amazon's competitors could. Amazon originally used the codename Fiona for the device.

Branding consultants Michael Cronan and Karin Hibma devised the Kindle name. Lab126 asked them to name the product, and they suggested "kindle", meaning to light a fire. They felt this was an apt metaphor for reading and intellectual excitement.

Kindle hardware evolved from the original Kindle introduced in 2007 and the Kindle DX (with its larger 9.7" screen) introduced in 2009. The DX remained the only non-6" E Ink Kindle device until the 2017 introduction of the Oasis 2. The range included early generation devices with a keyboard (Kindle Keyboard), devices with touch-sensitive, lighted, high-resolution screens (Kindle Paperwhite), early generations of a tablet computer with the Kindle app (Kindle Fire), and low-priced devices with a touch-sensitive screen (Kindle 7). However, the Kindle e-reader has often been a narrow-purpose device for reading rather than being multipurpose hardware that might create distractions while reading. Active Content support was introduced in 2010 only to be dropped from new Kindle devices in late 2014. After the first three generations, the Kindle Fire tablet branding was changed to Amazon Fire in 2014; this name change reflected their wider capabilities as an Android-derived tablet. Other later developments include devices with larger E Ink displays such as the Kindle Oasis 2 (2017) at 7" and the Paperwhite 5 (2021) at 6.8", as well as a device with a 10.2" screen and Wacom stylus support called the Kindle Scribe (2022). In 2022 Amazon also introduced the 11th gen Kindle with a 300 PPI display, ending the use of the 6" 167 PPI display that had been on every basic Kindle since 2007. In 2024 Amazon introduced the first color E Ink Kindle, the Kindle Colorsoft Signature Edition. In 2025 Amazon updated the Scribe lineup with a new design and introduced a Scribe Colorsoft model.

Amazon has also released Kindle apps for a wide range of devices and platforms, including Windows, macOS, Android, iOS, BlackBerry 10 and Windows Phone. Amazon also has a cloud reader to allow users to read e-books using modern web browsers.

== Device specifications ==
Model	Gen	Kindle OS	Launch	Model number	Price	Display	CPU	Memory	Storage	Sound	Ports	Input	Connectivity	Battery	Dimensions	Weight	IP code
Kindle	1	1.2.1	November 19, 2007	D00111	$399	6-inch (150 mm), 600 × 800 pixels, 167 PPI density, 4-level grayscale	Marvell Xscale PXA255 400 MHz, ARM9	64 MB	256/180 MB	Speakers, 3.5mm headphone Jack	USB 2.0 Mini-B port (data transfer only), SD card, 3.5 mm headphone jack, charging port	Keyboard, Scroll wheel	Amazon Whispernet	1,530 mAh	8.0 in (200 mm) H 5.3 in (130 mm) W 0.8 in (20 mm) D	10.2 oz (290 g)	No
Kindle 2	2	2.5.8	February 23, 2009	D00511 D00701	$299	6-inch (150 mm), 600 × 800 pixels, 167 PPI density, 16-level grayscale	Freescale i.MX31 532 MHz, ARM11	32 MB	2/1.4 GB	Speakers, 3.5mm headphone Jack	USB 2.0 Micro-B port, 3.5 mm headphone jack	Keyboard, D-pad	Amazon Whispernet	1,530 mAh	8.0 in (200 mm) H 5.3 in (130 mm) W 0.36 in (9.1 mm) D	10.2 oz (290 g)	No
Kindle 2 International	2	2.5.8	October 19, 2009		$279	6-inch (150 mm), 600 × 800 pixels, 167 PPI density, 16-level grayscale	Freescale i.MX31 532 MHz, ARM11	32 MB	2/1.4 GB	Speakers, 3.5mm headphone Jack	USB 2.0 Micro-B port, 3.5 mm headphone jack	Keyboard, D-pad	Amazon Whispernet	1,530 mAh	8.0 in (200 mm) H 5.3 in (130 mm) W 0.36 in (9.1 mm) D	10.2 oz (290 g)	No
Kindle DX	2	2.5.8	June 10, 2009	D00611	$489	9.7-inch, 824 × 1200 pixels, 150 PPI density, 16-level grayscale	Freescale i.MX31 532 MHz, ARM11	128 MB	4/3 GB	Speakers, 3.5mm headphone Jack	USB 2.0 Micro-B port, 3.5 mm headphone jack	Keyboard, D-pad	Amazon Whispernet	1,530 mAh	10.4 in (260 mm) H 7.2 in (180 mm) W 0.38 in (9.7 mm) D	18.9 oz (540 g)	No
Kindle DX International	2	2.5.8	January 6, 2010		?	9.7-inch, 824 × 1200 pixels, 150 PPI density, 16-level grayscale	Freescale i.MX31 532 MHz, ARM11	128 MB	4/3 GB	Speakers, 3.5mm headphone Jack	USB 2.0 Micro-B port, 3.5 mm headphone jack	Keyboard, D-pad	Amazon Whispernet	1,530 mAh	10.4 in (260 mm) H 7.2 in (180 mm) W 0.38 in (9.7 mm) D	18.9 oz (540 g)	No
Kindle DX Graphite	2	2.5.8	July 1, 2010	D00801	$379	9.7-inch, 824 × 1200 pixels, 150 PPI density, 16-level grayscale	Freescale i.MX31 532 MHz, ARM11	128 MB	4/3 GB	Speakers, 3.5mm headphone Jack	USB 2.0 Micro-B port, 3.5 mm headphone jack	Keyboard, D-pad	Amazon Whispernet	1,530 mAh	10.4 in (260 mm) H 7.2 in (180 mm) W 0.38 in (9.7 mm) D	18.9 oz (540 g)	No
Kindle Keyboard (Kindle 3)	3	3.4.3	August 27, 2010	D00901	Wi-Fi: $139; 3G: $189	6-inch (150 mm), 600 × 800 pixels, 167 PPI density, 16-level grayscale	Freescale i.MX35 532 MHz, ARM11	256 MB	4/3 GB	Speakers, 3.5mm headphone Jack	USB 2.0 Micro-B port, 3.5 mm headphone jack	Keyboard, D-pad	Amazon Whispernet (3G model only), 802.11bg Wi-Fi	1,750 mAh	7.5 in (190 mm) H 4.8 in (120 mm) W 0.34 in (8.6 mm) D	Wi-Fi: 8.5 oz (240 g) 3G: 8.7 oz (250 g)	No
Kindle 4	4	4.1.4	September 28, 2011	D01100	No ads: $109; Ads: $79	6-inch (150 mm), 600 × 800 pixels, 167 PPI density, 16-level grayscale	Freescale i.MX508 800 MHz	256 MB	2/1.25 GB	None	USB 2.0 Micro-B port	D-pad	Amazon Whispernet (3G model only), 802.11bgn Wi-Fi	890 mAh	6.5 in (170 mm) H 4.5 in (110 mm) W 0.34 in (8.6 mm) D	5.98 oz (170 g)	No
Kindle Touch	4	5.3.7.3	November 15, 2011	D01200	No ads: Wi-Fi: $149; 3G: $189 Ads: Wi-Fi: $99; 3G: $139	6-inch (150 mm), 600 × 800 pixels, 167 PPI density, 16-level grayscale	Freescale i.MX508 800 MHz	256 MB	4/3 GB	Speakers, 3.5mm headphone jack	USB 2.0 Micro-B port, 3.5 mm headphone jack	Touchscreen	Amazon Whispernet (3G model only), 802.11bgn Wi-Fi	1,420 mAh	6.8 in (170 mm) H 4.7 in (120 mm) W 0.40 in (10 mm) D	Wi-Fi: 7.5 oz (210 g) 3G: 7.8 oz (220 g)	No
Kindle 5	5	4.1.4	September 6, 2012	D01100	No ads: $90; Ads: $70	6-inch (150 mm), 600 × 800 pixels, 167 PPI density, 16-level grayscale	Freescale i.MX508 800 MHz	256 MB	2/1.25 GB	None	USB 2.0 Micro-B port	D-pad	Amazon Whispernet (3G model only), 802.11bgn Wi-Fi	890 mAh	6.5 in (170 mm) H 4.5 in (110 mm) W 0.34 in (8.6 mm) D	5.98 oz (170 g)	No
Kindle Paperwhite	5	5.6.1.1	October 1, 2012	EY21	No ads: Wi-Fi: $140; 3G: $200 Ads: Wi-Fi: $120; 3G: $180	6-inch, 768 × 1024 pixels, 212 PPI density, 16-level grayscale, LED frontlit	Freescale i.MX508 800 MHz	256 MB	2/1.25 GB	None	USB 2.0 Micro-B port	Touchscreen	Amazon Whispernet (3G model only), 802.11bgn Wi-Fi	1,420 mAh	6.7 in (170 mm) H 4.6 in (120 mm) W 0.36 in (9.1 mm) D	Wi-Fi: 7.5 oz (210 g) 3G: 7.8 oz (220 g)	No
Kindle Paperwhite 2	6	5.12.2.2	Wi-Fi: September 30, 2013, 3G: November 5, 2013	DP75SDI	No ads: Wi-Fi: $140; 3G: $210 Ads: Wi-Fi: $119; 3G: $139	6-inch, 768 × 1024 pixels, 212 PPI density, 16-level grayscale, LED frontlit	Freescale/NXP i.MX6 SoloLite 1 GHz	256 MB	2/1.25 GB or 4/3 GB	None	USB 2.0 Micro-B port	Touchscreen	Amazon Whispernet (3G model only), 802.11bgn Wi-Fi	1,420 mAh	6.7 in (170 mm) H 4.6 in (120 mm) W 0.36 in (9.1 mm) D	Wi-Fi: 7.3 oz (210 g) 3G: 7.6 oz (220 g)	No
Kindle 7	7	5.12.2.2	October 2, 2014	WP63GW	No ads: $100; Ads: $80	6-inch (150 mm), 600 × 800 pixels, 167 PPI density, 16-level grayscale	Freescale/NXP i.MX6 SoloLite 1 GHz	256 MB	4/3 GB	None	USB 2.0 Micro-B port	Touchscreen	Amazon Whispernet (3G model only), 802.11bgn Wi-Fi	890 mAh	6.7 in (170 mm) H 4.7 in (120 mm) W 0.40 in (10 mm) D	6.7 oz (190 g)	No
Kindle Voyage	7	5.13.6	November 4, 2014	NM460GZ	No ads: Wi-Fi: $220; 3G: $290 Ads: Wi-Fi: $200; 3G: $270	6-inch, 1072 × 1448 pixels, 300 PPI density, 16-level grayscale, LED frontlit	Freescale/NXP i.MX6 SoloLite 1 GHz	512 MB	4/3 GB	USB (through USB Audio Adapter)	USB 2.0 Micro-B port	Touchscreen	Amazon Whispernet (3G model only), 802.11bgn Wi-Fi	1,320mAh	6.4 in (160 mm) H 4.5 in (110 mm) W 0.30 in (7.6 mm) D	Wi-Fi: 6.3 oz (180 g) 3G: 6.6 oz (190 g)	No
Kindle Paperwhite 3	7	5.16.2.1.1	June 30, 2015	DP75SDI	No ads: Wi-Fi: $140; 3G: $210 Ads: Wi-Fi: $120; 3G: $190	6-inch, 1072 × 1448 pixels, 300 PPI density, 16-level grayscale, LED frontlit	Freescale/NXP i.MX6 SoloLite 1 GHz	512 MB	4/3 GB	USB (through USB Audio Adapter)	USB 2.0 Micro-B port	Touchscreen	Amazon Whispernet (3G model only), 802.11bgn Wi-Fi	1,420 mAh	6.7 in (170 mm) H 4.6 in (120 mm) W 0.36 in (9.1 mm) D	Wi-Fi: 7.2 oz (200 g) 3G: 7.7 oz (220 g)	No
Kindle Oasis	8	5.16.2.1.1	April 27, 2016	SW56RW	$289.99 – $379.99	6-inch, 1072 × 1448 pixels, 300 PPI density, 16-level grayscale, LED frontlit	Freescale/NXP i.MX6 SoloLite 1 GHz	512 MB	4/3 GB	Bluetooth	USB 2.0 Micro-B port	Touchscreen	Amazon Whispernet (3G model only), 802.11bgn Wi-Fi, Bluetooth	245 mAh (no cover); 1,535 mAh (with cover)	5.6 in (140 mm) H 4.8 in (120 mm) W 0.13 in (3.3 mm) D (without cover); 0.33 in (8.4 mm) D (with cover)	Wi-Fi: 4.6 oz (130 g) 3G: 4.7 oz (130 g) Cover only: 3.8 oz (110 g)	No
Kindle 8	8	5.16.2.1.1	June 22, 2016	SY69JL	No ads: $100; Ads: $80	6-inch (150 mm), 600 × 800 pixels, 167 PPI density, 16-level grayscale	Freescale/NXP i.MX6 SoloLite 1 GHz	512 MB	4/3 GB	Bluetooth	USB 2.0 Micro-B port	Touchscreen	Amazon Whispernet (3G model only), 802.11bgn Wi-Fi, Bluetooth	890 mAh	6.3 in (160 mm) H 4.5 in (110 mm) W 0.36 in (9.1 mm) D	5.7 oz (160 g)	No
Kindle Oasis 2	9	5.16.2.1.1	October 31, 2017	CW24WI	$249.99 – $349.99	7-inch, 1264 × 1680 pixels, 300 PPI density, 16-level grayscale, LED frontlit	NXP i.MX7D 1 GHz	512 MB	8/6 GB or 32/30 GB	Bluetooth	USB 2.0 Micro-B port	Touchscreen	Amazon Whispernet (3G model only), 802.11bgn Wi-Fi, Bluetooth	1,000 mAh	6.3 in (160 mm) H 5.6 in (140 mm) W 0.33 in (8.4 mm) D	6.8 oz (190 g)	IPX8
Kindle Paperwhite 4	10	5.18.1	November 7, 2018	PQ94WIF	$129.99+	6-inch, 1072 × 1448 pixels, 300 PPI density, 16-level grayscale, LED frontlit	Freescale/NXP i.MX6 SoloLite 1 GHz	512 MB	8/6 GB or 32/30 GB	Bluetooth	USB 2.0 Micro-B port	Touchscreen	Amazon Whispernet (3G model only), 802.11bgn Wi-Fi, Bluetooth	1,500 mAh	6.6 in (170 mm) H 4.6 in (120 mm) W 0.32 in (8.1 mm) D	Wi-Fi: 6.4 oz (180 g) 3G: 6.7 oz (190 g)	IPX8
Kindle 10	10	5.18.1	April 10, 2019	J9G29R	No ads: $109.99; Ads: $89.99	6-inch (150 mm), 600 × 800 pixels, 167 PPI density, 16-level grayscale, LED frontlit	Freescale/NXP i.MX6 SoloLite 1 GHz	512 MB	4/3 GB or 8/6 GB	Bluetooth	USB 2.0 Micro-B port	Touchscreen	Amazon Whispernet (3G model only), 802.11bgn Wi-Fi, Bluetooth	1,040 mAh	6.3 in (160 mm) H 4.5 in (110 mm) W 0.34 in (8.6 mm) D	6.1 oz (170 g)	No
Kindle Oasis 3	10	5.18.2	July 24, 2019	S8IN4O	$249.99 – $349.99	7-inch, 1264 × 1680 pixels, 300 PPI density, 16-level grayscale, LED frontlit	NXP i.MX7D 1 GHz	512 MB	8/6 GB or 32/30 GB	Bluetooth	USB 2.0 Micro-B port	Touchscreen	Amazon Whispernet (3G model only), 802.11bgn Wi-Fi, Bluetooth	1,130 mAh	6.3 in (160 mm) H 5.6 in (140 mm) W 0.33 in (8.4 mm) D	6.6 oz (190 g)	IPX8
Kindle Paperwhite 5	11	5.19.2	October 27, 2021	M2L3EK	$139.99 – $159.99	6.8-inch, 1236 × 1648 pixels, 300 PPI density, 16-level grayscale, LED frontlit (17 LEDs)	MediaTek MT8110 1 GHz	512 MB	8GB or 16 GB	Bluetooth	USB-C port	Touchscreen	Dual-band 802.11 Wi-Fi (no ad-hoc support), Bluetooth (audio only, limited to VoiceView for accessibility or for Audible content in approved countries)	1,700 mAh	6.9 in (180 mm) H 4.9 in (120 mm) W 0.32 in (8.1 mm) D	7.23 oz (205 g)	IPX8
Kindle Paperwhite 5 Signature Edition	11	5.19.2	October 27, 2021	M2L4EK	$189.99	6.8-inch, 1236 × 1648 pixels, 300 PPI density, 16-level grayscale, LED frontlit (17 LEDs)	MediaTek MT8110 1 GHz	512 MB	32/30 GB	Bluetooth	USB-C port Qi charging	Touchscreen	Dual-band 802.11 Wi-Fi (no ad-hoc support), Bluetooth (audio only, limited to VoiceView for accessibility or for Audible content in approved countries)	1,700 mAh	6.9 in (180 mm) H 4.9 in (120 mm) W 0.32 in (8.1 mm) D	7.3 oz (210 g)	IPX8
Kindle 11	11	5.19.2	October 12, 2022	C2V2L3	No ads: $119.99; Ads: $99.99	6-inch, 1072 × 1448 pixels, 300 PPI, 16-level grayscale, LED frontlit	MediaTek MT8113 1 GHz	512 MB	16 GB	Bluetooth	USB-C port	Touchscreen	Dual-band 802.11 Wi-Fi (no ad-hoc support), Bluetooth (audio only, limited to VoiceView for accessibility or for Audible content in approved countries)	1,040 mAh	6.21 in (158 mm) H 4.28 in (109 mm) W 0.315 in (8.0 mm) D	5.56 oz (158 g)	No
Kindle Scribe	11	5.20.2.0.1	November 30, 2022	C4A6T4	16 GB with Basic Pen: $339.99 64 GB with Premium Pen: $419.99	10.2-inch, 1860 × 2480 pixels, 300 PPI, 16-level grayscale, LED frontlit	MediaTek MT8113 1 GHz	1 GB	16 GB, 32 GB or 64 GB	Bluetooth	USB-C port	Touchscreen, Stylus Pen	Dual-band 802.11 Wi-Fi (no ad-hoc support), Bluetooth (audio only, limited to VoiceView for accessibility or for Audible content in approved countries)	3,000 mAh	9 in (230 mm) H 7.7 in (200 mm) W 0.22 in (5.6 mm) D	15.3 oz (430 g)	No
Kindle 11 (2024)	11	5.20.2.0.1	October 16, 2024	RS23CV	No ads: $129.99; Ads: $109.99	6-inch, 1072 × 1448 pixels, 300 PPI, 16-level grayscale, LED frontlit	MediaTek MT8113 1 GHz	1 GB	16 GB	Bluetooth	USB-C port	Touchscreen	Dual-band 802.11 Wi-Fi (no ad-hoc support), Bluetooth (audio only, limited to VoiceView for accessibility or for Audible content in approved countries)	1040 mAh	6.2 in (157.8 mm) H 4.3 in (108.6 mm) W 0.32 in (8.0 mm) D	5.56 oz (158 g)	No
Kindle Paperwhite 6	12	5.20.2.0.1	October 16, 2024	SA568B	No ads: $179.99; Ads: $159.99	7-inch, 1272 x 1696 pixels, 300 PPI density, 16-level grayscale, LED frontlit	MediaTek MT8113 1 GHz	1 GB	16 GB	Bluetooth	USB-C port	Touchscreen	Dual-band 802.11 Wi-Fi (no ad-hoc support), Bluetooth (audio only, limited to VoiceView for accessibility or for Audible content in approved countries)	1,900 mAh	7 in (176.7 mm) H 5 in (127.6 mm) W 0.3 in (7.8 mm) D	7.4 oz (211g)	IPX8
Kindle Paperwhite 6 Signature Edition	12	5.20.2.0.1	October 16, 2024	SA569P	$199.99	7-inch, 1272 x 1696 pixels, 300 PPI density, 16-level grayscale, LED frontlit	MediaTek MT8113 1 GHz	1 GB	32 GB	Bluetooth	USB-C port Qi charging	Touchscreen	Dual-band 802.11 Wi-Fi (no ad-hoc support), Bluetooth (audio only, limited to VoiceView for accessibility or for Audible content in approved countries)	1,900 mAh	7 in (176.7 mm) H 5 in (127.6 mm) W 0.3 in (7.8 mm) D	7.5 oz (214g)	IPX8
Kindle Colorsoft Signature Edition	12	5.20.2.0.1	October 30, 2024	SA59CP	$279.99	7-inch, 1264 × 1680 pixels, 300 ppi B&W, 150 ppi color, 16-level grayscale, LED frontlit	MediaTek MT8113 1 GHz	1 GB	32 GB	Bluetooth	USB-C port Qi charging	Touchscreen	Dual-band 802.11 Wi-Fi (no ad-hoc support), Bluetooth (audio only, limited to VoiceView for accessibility or for Audible content in approved countries)	2,310 mAh	7 in (176.7 mm) H 5 in (127.6 mm) W 0.3 in (7.8 mm) D	7.7oz (219g)	IPX8
Kindle Scribe (2024)	11	5.20.2.0.1	December 4, 2024	C4A6T4 (same as previous model)	$399.99	10.2-inch, 1860 × 2480 pixels, 300 PPI, 16-level grayscale, LED frontlit	MediaTek MT8113 1 GHz	1 GB	16 GB, 32 GB or 64 GB	Bluetooth	USB-C port	Touchscreen, Stylus Pen	Dual-band 802.11 Wi-Fi (no ad-hoc support), Bluetooth (audio only, limited to VoiceView for accessibility or for Audible content in approved countries)	3000 mAh	9.0 in (230 mm) H 7.7 in (196 mm) W 0.22 in (5.7 mm) D	Device: 15.3oz (433g device only) Premium Pen: .60 oz (17g)	No
Kindle Colorsoft (2025)	12	5.20.2.0.1	July 24, 2025	SA59CP (same as previous model)	$249.99	7-inch, 1264 × 1680 pixels, 300 ppi B&W, 150 ppi color, 16-level grayscale, LED frontlit	MediaTek MT8113 1 GHz	1 GB	16 GB	Bluetooth	USB-C port Qi charging	Touchscreen	Dual-band 802.11 Wi-Fi (no ad-hoc support), Bluetooth (audio only, limited to VoiceView for accessibility or for Audible content in approved countries)	2310 mAh	7 in (176.7 mm) H 5 in (127.6 mm) W 0.3 in (7.8 mm) D	7.6 oz (220 g)	IPX8
Kindle Colorsoft Signature Edition (2025)	12	5.20.2.0.1	July 24, 2025	SA59CP (same as previous model)	$279.99	7-inch, 1264 × 1680 pixels, 300 ppi B&W, 150 ppi color, 16-level grayscale, LED frontlit	MediaTek MT8113 1 GHz	1 GB	32 GB	Bluetooth	USB-C port Qi charging	Touchscreen	Dual-band 802.11 Wi-Fi (no ad-hoc support), Bluetooth (audio only, limited to VoiceView for accessibility or for Audible content in approved countries)	2310 mAh	7 in (176.7 mm) H 5 in (127.6 mm) W 0.3 in (7.8 mm) D	7.7 oz (220 g)	IPX8
Kindle Scribe Colorsoft (2025)	12	5.20.2.0.1	December 10, 2025	B0DWRBVDN6 (Graphite 32GB) B0FC1ZS9QZ (Graphite 64GB) B0FC1WNVMX (Fig 64GB)	$629.99	11-inch, 300 ppi B&W, 150 ppi color, 16-level grayscale, LED frontlit	MediaTek MT8113 1 GHz	4GB	32 GB (21 GB available to user), 64 GB (50 GB available to user)	Bluetooth	USB-C port	Touchscreen, (Wacom compatible) Stylus Pen	Dual-band 802.11 Wi-Fi (no ad-hoc support), Bluetooth (audio only, limited to VoiceView for accessibility or for Audible content in approved countries)	3000 mAh	Device: 9.6 in (245 mm) H 7.4 in (189 mm) W 0.21 in (5.3 mm) D Premium Pen: 6.1 in (155 mm) H .35 in (8.8 mm) W	Device: 14.1 oz (400 g) Premium pen: 0.6 oz (17 g)	No
Kindle (2026)	N/A (Note: Amazon omitted generation numbering from official product titles and descriptions beginning with the 2026 lineup.)	5.20.2.0.1	October 1, 2026	Z8PC57	No ads: $169.99 Ads: $149.99	6-inch, 300 ppi, 16-level grayscale, LED frontlit	Unknown	Unknown	16 GB	Bluetooth	USB-C port	Touchscreen	Dual-band 802.11 Wi-Fi (no ad-hoc support), Bluetooth (audio only, limited to VoiceView for accessibility or for Audible content in approved countries)	Unknown	6 in (152.8 mm) H 4.3 in (108.0 mm) W 0.3 in (6.85 mm) D	4.9 oz (140 g)	No
Kindle (Aluminium, 2026)	N/A	5.20.2.0.1	October 1, 2026	LP38MA	$189.99	6-inch, 300 ppi, 16-level grayscale, LED frontlit	Unknown	Unknown	32 GB	Bluetooth	USB-C port	Touchscreen	Dual-band 802.11 Wi-Fi (no ad-hoc support), Bluetooth (audio only, limited to VoiceView for accessibility or for Audible content in approved countries)	Unknown	6 in (152.8 mm) H 4.3 in (108.0 mm) W 0.3 in (6.85 mm) D	5.7 oz (162 g)	No
Kindle Paperwhite 7	N/A	5.20.2.0.1	October 28, 2026	Z4P32D	No ads: $219.99 Ads: $199.99	7-inch, 300 ppi, 16-level grayscale, LED frontlit, warm light	Unknown	Unknown	16 GB	Bluetooth	USB-C port	Touchscreen	Dual-band 802.11 Wi-Fi (no ad-hoc support), Bluetooth (audio only, limited to VoiceView for accessibility or for Audible content in approved countries)	Unknown	6.9 in (174.7 mm) H 5.0 in (126.8 mm) W 0.3 in (6.8 mm) D	7.2 oz (204 g)	IPX8
Kindle Paperwhite 7 Signature Edition	N/A	5.20.2.0.1	October 28, 2026	Z4P36D	$249.99	7-inch, 300 ppi, 16-level grayscale, auto-adjusting LED frontlit, warm light	Unknown	Unknown	32 GB	Bluetooth	USB-C port, magnetic pogo-pin dock	Touchscreen	Dual-band 802.11 Wi-Fi (no ad-hoc support), Bluetooth (audio only, limited to VoiceView for accessibility or for Audible content in approved countries)	Unknown	6.9 in (174.7 mm) H 5.0 in (126.8 mm) W 0.3 in (6.8 mm) D	8.1 oz (229 g)	IPX8
Kindle Colorsoft (2026)	N/A	5.20.2.0.1	October 28, 2026	T3R8L5	$289.99	7-inch, 300 ppi B&W, 150 ppi color, 16-level grayscale, LED frontlit, warm light	Dual-core 2 GHz MediaTek	1GB	16 GB	Bluetooth	USB-C port	Touchscreen	Dual-band 802.11 Wi-Fi (no ad-hoc support), Bluetooth (audio only, limited to VoiceView for accessibility or for Audible content in approved countries)	2310 mAh	6.9 in (174.7 mm) H 5.0 in (126.8 mm) W 0.3 in (6.8 mm) D	7.2 oz (204 g)	IPX8
Kindle Colorsoft Signature Edition (2026)	N/A	5.20.2.0.1	October 28, 2026	T3R8L7	$319.99	7-inch, 300 ppi B&W, 150 ppi color, 16-level grayscale, auto-adjusting LED frontlit, warm light	Dual-core 2 GHz MediaTek	1GB	32GB	Bluetooth	USB-C port, magnetic pogo-pin dock	Touchscreen	Dual-band 802.11 Wi-Fi (no ad-hoc support), Bluetooth (audio only, limited to VoiceView for accessibility or for Audible content in approved countries)	2310 mAh	6.9 in (174.7 mm) H 5.0 in (126.8 mm) W 0.3 in (6.8 mm) D	8.1 oz (229 g)	IPX8

== Features ==
Kindle devices support dictionary and Wikipedia look-up functions when highlighting a word in an e-book. The font type, size and margins can be customized. Kindles are charged by connecting to a computer's USB port or to an AC adapter. Users needing accessibility due to impaired vision can use an audio adapter to listen to any e-book read aloud on supported Kindles, or those with difficulty in reading text may use the Amazon Ember Bold font for darker text and other fonts may too have bold font versions. It also includes other fonts for accessibility like OpenDyslexic.

The Kindle also contains experimental features such as a web browser that uses NetFront based on WebKit. The browser can freely access the Kindle Store and Wikipedia on 3G models while the browser may be limited to 50 MB of data per month to websites other than Amazon and Wikipedia. Other possible experimental features, depending on the model are a Text-to-Speech engine that can read the text from e-books and an MP3 player that can be used to play music while reading.

The Kindle's operating system updates are designed to be received wirelessly and installed automatically during a period in sleep mode in which Wi-Fi is turned on. A user may install firmware updates manually by downloading the firmware for their device and copying the file to the device's root directory. The Kindle operating system uses the Linux kernel with a Java app for reading e-books.

=== Send to Kindle service ===
Amazon initially offered a Personal Documents Service to add content to a user's Kindle which only worked via email. Documents were sent directly to the Kindle via WhisperSync. Later expansions added cloud library features and content management. The modern service is called Send to Kindle and is available through various means such as email, website, app, or browser extension. It allows the user to send files such as EPUB, PDF, HTML pages, Microsoft Word documents, GIF, PNG, and BMP graphics directly to the user's Kindle library. When Amazon receives the file, it converts the file to Kindle File Format and stores it in the user's online library (called "Your Content" by Amazon). Content added via Send to Kindle is added to the user library as Personal Documents by default, but some Send to Kindle interfaces allow users to send a document to a specific device and skip adding it to the library. The Send to Kindle service's personal documents can be accessed by all Kindle hardware devices as well as iOS and Android devices using the Kindle app.

Until August 2022, in addition to the document types mentioned above, this service could be used to send unprotected and original version only .mobi/.azw files to a user's Kindle library.

Sending the file is free if downloaded using Wi-Fi, but, prior to 2021, cost $0.15 per MB when using Kindle's former 3G service.

=== Format support by device ===
The first Kindle could read unprotected Mobipocket files (MOBI, PRC), plain text files (TXT), Topaz format books (TPZ) and Amazon's AZW format.

The Kindle 2 added native PDF capability with the version 2.3 firmware upgrade. The Kindle 1 could not read PDF files, but Amazon provides experimental conversion to the native AZW format, with the caveat that not all PDFs may format correctly. The Kindle 2 added the ability to play the Audible Enhanced (AAX) format. The Kindle 2 can also display HTML files.

The fourth and later generation Kindles, Touch, Paperwhite (all generations), Voyage and Oasis (all generations) can display AZW, AZW3, TXT, PDF, unprotected MOBI, and PRC files natively. HTML, DOC, DOCX, JPEG, GIF, PNG, and BMP are usable through Amazon's conversion service. The Keyboard, Touch, Oasis 2 & 3, Kindle 8 & 9, and Paperwhite 4 can also play Audible Enhanced (AA, AAX). All Kindle models from the Kindle Paperwhite 2 and newer can display KFX files natively. KFX is Amazon's successor to the AZW3 format.

Kindles cannot natively display EPUB files. However, at least two methods allow viewing the content of EPUB formatted content on Kindles:

1. Specialized software like Calibre allows EPUB or some other unsupported files to be converted to one of the supported file formats.
2. Kindles can be jailbroken to allow third-party software, such as KOReader which does support EPUB, to be installed.

In late April 2022, Amazon announced that Send to Kindle would support EPUB, beginning in late 2022.

=== Multiple devices and organization ===
An e-book may be downloaded from Amazon to several devices at the same time, as long as the devices are registered to the same Amazon account. A sharing limit typically ranges from one to six devices, depending on an undisclosed number of licenses set by the publisher. When a limit is reached, the user must remove the e-book from some device or unregister a device containing the e-book in order to add the e-book to another device.

The original Kindle and Kindle 2 did not allow the user to organize books into folders. The user could only select what type of content to display on the home screen and whether to organize by author, title, or download date. Kindle software version 2.5 allowed for the organization of books into "Collections" which behave like non-structured tags/labels: a collection cannot include other collections, and one book may be added to multiple collections. These collections are normally set and organized on the Kindle itself, one book at a time. Collections can also be sent from one Kindle device to another. There is no option to organize by series or series order, as the AZW format does not possess the necessary metadata fields.

=== X-Ray ===
X-Ray is a reference tool that is incorporated in Kindle Touch and later devices, the Fire tablets, the Kindle app for mobile platforms and Fire TV. X-Ray lets users explore in greater depth the contents of a book, by accessing preloaded files with relevant information, such as the most common characters, locations, themes, or ideas.

=== Annotations ===
Users can bookmark, highlight, and search through content. Pages can be bookmarked for reference, and notes can be added to relevant content. While a book is open on the display, menu options allow users to search for synonyms and definitions from the built-in dictionary. The device also remembers the last page read for each book. Pages can be saved as a "clipping", or a text file containing the text of the currently displayed page. All clippings are appended to a single file, which can be downloaded over a USB cable. Due to the TXT format of the clippings file, all formatting (such as bold, italics, bigger fonts for headlines, etc.) is stripped from the original text.

=== Textbook rentals ===
On July 18, 2011, Amazon began a program that allows college students to rent Kindle textbooks from three different publishers for a fixed period of time.

=== Collection of users' reading data ===
Kindle devices may report information about their users' reading data that includes the last page read, how long each e-book was opened, annotations, bookmarks, notes, highlights, or similar markings to Amazon. The Kindle stores this information on all Amazon e-books but it is unclear if this data is stored for non-Amazon e-books. There is a lack of e-reader data privacy — Amazon knows the user's identity, what the user is reading, whether the user has finished the book, what page the user is on, how long the user has spent on each page, and which passages the user may have highlighted.

== Kindle ecosystem ==
=== Kindle Store ===
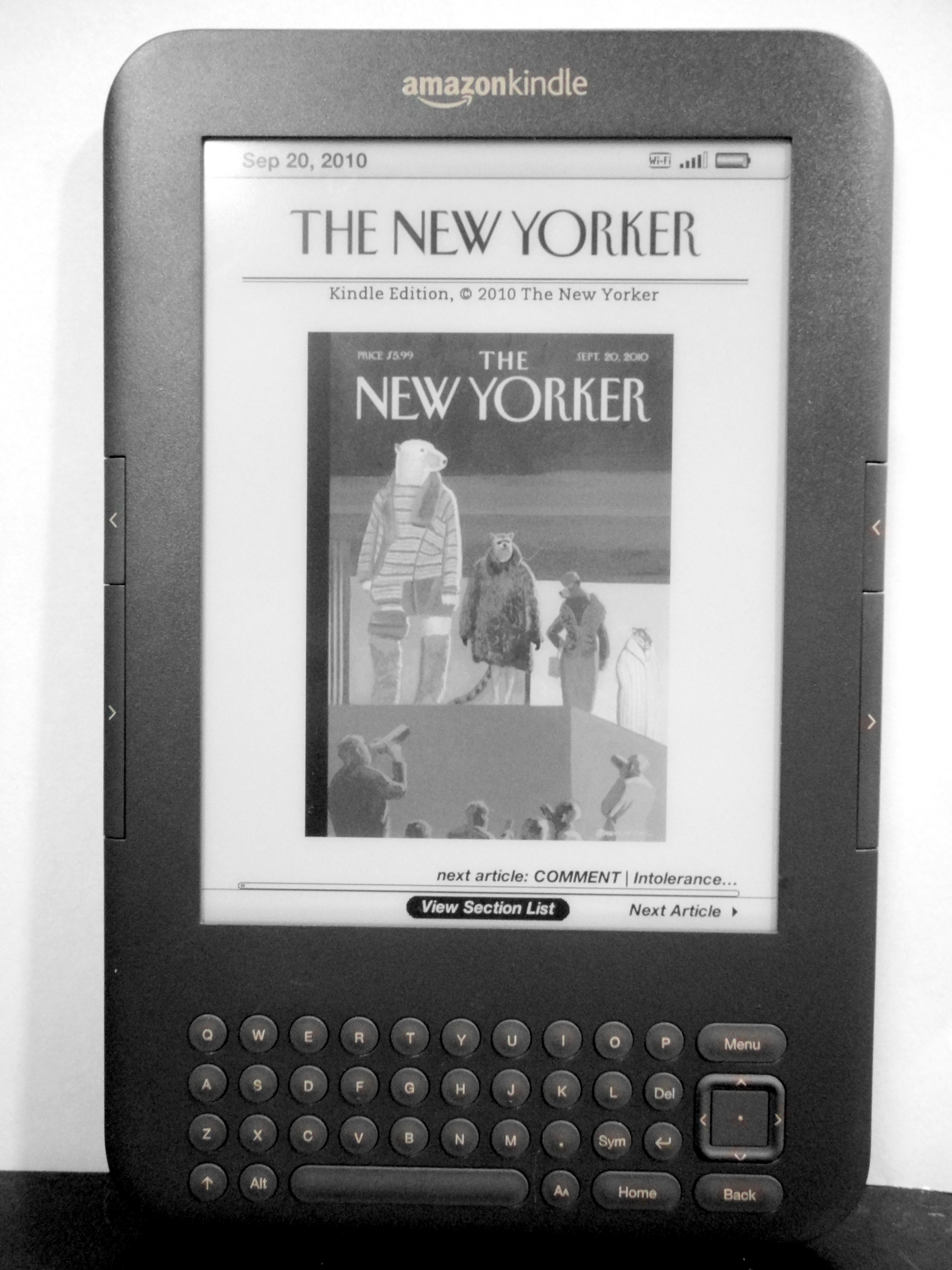
The New Yorker subscribed on a Kindle Keyboard

Content from Amazon's Kindle Store is encoded in Amazon's proprietary Kindle formats (.azw, .kf8 and .kfx). In addition to published content, Kindle users can also access the Internet using the experimental web browser, which uses NetFront. Users can use the Kindle Store to access reading material using the Kindle itself or through a web browser to access content. The store features Kindle Unlimited for unlimited access to over one million e-books for a monthly fee.

Content for the Kindle can be purchased online and downloaded wirelessly in some countries, using either standard Wi-Fi or Amazon's 3G Whispernet network. Whispernet is accessible without any monthly fees or a subscription, although fees can be incurred for the delivery of periodicals and other content when roaming internationally beyond the customer's home country. Through a service called Whispersync, customers can synchronize reading progress, bookmarks, and other information across Kindle hardware and other mobile devices. The Kindles that only can access Whispernet via the 3G network had that network turned off in December 2021 due to the carriers retiring 3G.

For U.S. customers traveling abroad, Amazon originally charged a $1.99 fee to download e-books over 3G while overseas, but later removed the fee. Fees remain for wireless 3G delivery of periodical subscriptions and personal documents, while Wi-Fi delivery has no extra charge.

In addition to the Kindle Store, content for the Kindle can be purchased from various independent sources such as Fictionwise and Baen Ebooks. Public domain titles are also obtainable for the Kindle via content providers such as Project Gutenberg, The Internet Archive and the World Public Library. In 2011, the Kindle Store had more than twice as much paid content as its nearest competitor, Barnes & Noble.

Public libraries that offer books via OverDrive, Inc. can also choose to lend titles for the Kindle and Kindle reading apps in the US via Libby. Books can be checked out from the library's own site, which forwards to Amazon for the completion of the checkout process. The Libby app stores user account and library details during set up and can send content to the users Amazon account at the time of checkout. Amazon then delivers the title to the Kindle for the duration of the loan, though some titles may require transfer via a USB connection to a computer. If the book is later checked out again or purchased, annotations and bookmarks are preserved.

=== Kindle applications for reading on other devices ===
Amazon released the Kindle for PC application in late 2009, available for Microsoft Windows systems. This application allows ebooks from Amazon's store or personal ebooks to be read on a personal computer, with no Kindle device required. Amazon released a Kindle for Mac app for Apple Macintosh & OS X systems in early 2010. In June 2010, Amazon released the Amazon Kindle for Android. Soon after the Android release, versions for the Apple iOS (iPhone and iPad) and BlackBerry OS phones were available. In January 2011, Amazon released Kindle for Windows Phone. In July 2011, Kindle for HP TouchPad (running webOS) was released in the U.S. as a beta version. In August 2011, Amazon released an HTML5-based webapp for supported web browsers called Kindle Cloud Reader. In 2013, Amazon has expressed no interest in releasing a separate Kindle application for Linux systems; the Cloud Reader can be used on supported browsers in Linux.

It is also possible to use Kindle via the Web.

On April 17, 2014, Samsung announced it would discontinue its own e-book store effective July 1, 2014, and it partnered with Amazon to create the Kindle for Samsung app optimized for display on Samsung Galaxy devices. The app uses Amazon's e-book store and it includes a monthly limited selection of free e-books.

In June 2016, Amazon released the Page Flip feature to its Kindle applications that debuted on its e-readers a few years previously. This feature allows the user to flip through nine thumbnails of page images at a time.

=== Kindle Direct Publishing ===
Concurrently with the release of the first Kindle device, Amazon launched Kindle Direct Publishing, used by authors and publishers to independently publish their books directly to Kindle and Kindle Apps worldwide. Authors can upload documents in several formats for delivery via Whispernet and charge between $0.99 and $200.00 per download.

In a December 5, 2009, interview with The New York Times, Amazon CEO Jeff Bezos revealed that Amazon keeps 65% of the revenue from all e-book sales for the Kindle; the remaining 35% is split between the book author and publisher. After numerous commentators observed that Apple's popular App Store offers 70% of royalties to the publisher, Amazon began a program that offers 70% royalties to Kindle publishers who agree to certain conditions. Some of these conditions, such as the inability to opt out of the lendability feature, have caused some controversy.

=== Kindle Development Kit ===
On January 21, 2010, Amazon announced the release of its Kindle Development Kit (KDK). KDK aims to allow developers to build "active content" for the Kindle, and a beta version was announced with a February 2010 release date. A number of companies have already experimented with delivering active content through the Kindle's bundled browser, and the KDK gives sample code, documentation and a Kindle Simulator together with a new revenue sharing model for developers. The KDK is based on the Java programming language's Personal Basis Profile packaged Java APIs.

As of May 2014, the Kindle store offered over 400 items labeled as active content. These items include simple applications and games, including a free set provided by Amazon Digital Services. As of 2014, active content is only available to users with a U.S. billing address.

In October 2014, Amazon announced that the Voyage and future e-readers would not support active content because most users prefer to use apps on their smartphones and tablets, but the Paperwhite first-iteration and earlier Kindles would continue to support active content.

== Reception ==
=== Sales ===
Specific Kindle device sales numbers are not released by Amazon; however, according to anonymous inside sources, over three million Kindles had been sold as of December 2009, while external estimates, as of Q4-2009, place the number at about 1.5 million. According to James McQuivey of Forrester Research, estimates are ranging around four million, as of mid-2010.

In 2010, Amazon remained the undisputed leader in the e-reader category, accounting for 59% of e-readers shipped, and it gained 14 percentage points in share. According to an International Data Corporation (IDC) study from March 2011, sales for all e-book readers worldwide reached 12.8 million in 2010; 48% of them were Kindles. In the last three months of 2010, Amazon announced that in the United States its e-book sales had surpassed sales of paperback books for the first time.

In January 2011, Amazon announced that digital books were outselling their traditional print counterparts for the first time ever on its site, with an average of 115 Kindle editions being sold for every 100 paperback editions. In December 2011, Amazon announced that customers had purchased "well over" one million Kindles per week since the end of November 2011; this includes all available Kindle models and also the Kindle Fire tablet. IDC estimated that the Kindle Fire sold about 4.7 million units during the fourth quarter of 2011. Pacific Crest estimated that the Kindle Fire models sold six million units during Q4 2012.

Morgan Stanley estimates that Amazon sold $3.57 billion worth of Kindle e-readers and tablets in 2012, $4.5 billion in Kindle device sales in 2013 and $5 billion in Kindle device sales in 2014.

Amazon claims that their sales had reached a decade-long high before the announcement of the 2024 models.

=== Aftermarket ===
Working Kindles in good condition can be sold, traded, donated or recycled in the aftermarket. Due to some Kindle devices being limited to use as reading device and the hassle of reselling Kindles, some people choose to donate their Kindle to schools, developing countries, literacy organizations, or charities. "The Kindle Classroom Project" promotes reading by distributing donated Kindles to schools in need. Worldreader and "Develop Africa" ships donated e-readers to schools in developing countries in Africa for educational use. "Project Hart" may take donations of e-readers that could be given to people in need.

Whether in good condition or not, Kindles should not be disposed of in normal waste due to the device's electronic ink components and batteries. Instead, Kindles at the end of their useful life should be recycled. In the United States, Amazon runs their own program, 'Take Back', which allows owners to print out a prepaid shipping label, which can be used to return the device for disposal.

== Criticism ==
=== Removal of Nineteen Eighty-Four and Animal Farm ===
On July 17, 2009, Amazon withdrew from sale two e-books by George Orwell (Animal Farm and Nineteen Eighty-Four), refunding the purchase price to those who had bought them, and remotely deleted these titles from purchasers' devices without warning using a backdoor after discovering that the publisher lacked rights to publish these books. The two books were protected by copyright in the United States, but they were in the public domain in Canada, Australia and other countries. Notes and annotations for the books made by users on their devices were left in a separate file but "rendered useless" without the content to which they were directly linked. The move prompted outcry and comparisons to Nineteen Eighty-Four itself: in the novel, books, magazines, and newspapers in public archives that contradict the ruling party are either edited long after being published or destroyed outright; the removed materials go "down the memory hole", the nickname for an incinerator chute used in 1984. Customers and commentators noted the resemblance to the censorship in the novel, and described Amazon's action in Orwellian terms. Ars Technica argued that the deletion violated the Kindle's terms of service, which stated in part:

Upon your payment of the applicable fees set by Amazon, Amazon grants you the non-exclusive right to keep a permanent copy of the applicable Digital Content and to view, use and display such Digital Content an unlimited number of times, solely on the Device or as authorized by Amazon as part of the Service and solely for your personal, non-commercial use.

==== Company response ====
Amazon spokesman Drew Herdener said that the company is "changing our systems so that in the future we will not remove books from customers' devices in these circumstances." On July 23, 2009, Amazon CEO Jeff Bezos posted on Amazon's official Kindle forum an apology about the company's handling of the matter. Bezos said the action was "stupid", and that the executives at Amazon "deserve the criticism received".

==== Aftermath ====
On July 30, 2009, Justin Gawronski, a US high school senior, and Antoine Bruguier, an American engineer, filed suit against Amazon in the United States District Court for the Western District of Washington. Bruguier argued that Amazon had violated its terms of service by remotely deleting the copy of Nineteen Eighty-Four he purchased, in the process preventing him from accessing annotations he had written. Gawronski's copy of the e-book was also deleted without his consent, and found Amazon used deceit in an email exchange. The complaint, which sought class-action status, asked for both monetary and injunctive relief. The case was settled on September 25, 2009, with Amazon agreeing to pay $150,000 divided between the two plaintiffs, on the understanding that the law firm representing them, Kamber Edelson, "will donate its portion of that fee to a charitable organization". In the settlement, Amazon also provided wider rights to Kindle owners over its e-books:

For copies of Works purchased pursuant to TOS granting "the non-exclusive right to keep a permanent copy" of each purchased Work and to "view, use and display [such Works] an unlimited number of times, solely on the [Devices]... and solely for [the purchasers'] personal, non-commercial use", Amazon will not remotely delete or modify such Works from Devices purchased and being used in the U.S. unless (a) the user consents to such deletion or modification; (b) the user requests a refund for the work or otherwise fails to pay for the work (e.g., if a credit card issuer declines payment); (c) a judicial or regulatory order requires such deletion or modification; or (d) deletion or modification is reasonably necessary to protect the consumer, the operation of a device or network used for communication (e.g., to remove harmful code embedded within an e-book on a device).

On September 4, 2009, Amazon offered all affected users a choice of restoring of the deleted e-books or receiving an Amazon gift certificate or check for US$30.

=== Other incidents ===
In December 2010, Amazon removed three e-books written by Selena Kitt, along with works by several other self-published erotic fiction authors, for "offensive" content regarding consensual incest that violated Amazon's publishing guidelines. Kitt stated her opinion this Amazon policy was selectively applied to some books but not others that feature similar themes. For what Amazon describes as "a brief period of time", the books were unavailable for redownload by users who had already purchased them. This ability was restored after it was brought to Amazon's attention; however, no remote deletion took place.

In October 2012, Amazon suspended the account of a Norwegian woman who purchased her Kindle in the United Kingdom, and the company deleted every e-book on her Kindle. Amazon claimed that she had violated their terms of service but did not specify what she had done wrong. After the woman contacted the media, Amazon restored her account and her purchased e-books.

Computer programmer Richard Stallman criticized the Kindle, citing Kindle terms of service which can censor users, which require the user's identification, and that can have a negative effect on independent book distributors; he also cited reported restrictions on Kindle users, as well the ability for Amazon to delete e-books and update software without the users' permission.

Since 2012, Amazon has sold e-books in China and later began selling the Kindle e-book readers from 2013 onwards. Amazon had also announced that it has sold several million Kindles in the country and that China became the world's biggest regional market for the Kindle in 2016. However, it was reported that Chinese consumers prefer using their smartphones over e-readers, notwithstanding competition from Tencent, Alibaba, JD.com and Douban, each with their own e-book readers or marketplaces. Domestically developed e-book readers from brands like Xiaomi, iReader and Onyx Boox also offer added competition to the Kindle. In 2022, Amazon announced it had stopped selling its Kindles to distributors in China and stated the online bookstore service would shut down in China on June 30, 2023.

On January 4, 2022, a Kindle shortage was reported on Amazon's JD.com flagship store. Only the Kindle 10 had remained available for sale while other models like the Paperwhite, Oasis and Kids Edition had become out of stock. On the same day, It was announced that Amazon had also shut its Tmall flagship store, after having already closed its Kindle flagship store on Taobao earlier in October 2021. These led to speculation that Amazon was planning to exit the Chinese market altogether, although an official Amazon representative responded that they remain committed to serving Chinese consumers and they can continue to purchase the Kindle through offline and third-party online retailers.

In June 2022, Amazon announced that it will shut down its Kindle bookstore in China and starting July 2023 Kindle users can no longer purchase online books in the country. However, existing customers could still download previously bought titles until June 2024.

Also in June 2022, self-published authors protested against Amazon's e-book return policy; whenever an e-book return is made, royalties originally paid to the author at the time of purchase are deducted from their earnings balance, leaving authors with negative balances.

=== Discontinued support for older models ===
In April 2026, Amazon announced the end of support for 13 early models on May 20, 2026. While it wouldn't make the devices entirely unusable (bricked), it would greatly reduce functionality, such as library e-book access via Libby. Shortly before the end date, consumer advocates USPIRG, longtime opponents of e-waste, launched an online petition campaign to press Amazon to keep the devices - many with batteries and screens quite functional - alive or allow third-party options.

== Timeline of Kindle models ==
Timeline of Kindle models

Disclaimer: The discontinuation dates may not be precise.

== See also ==
- Comparison of e-book readers
- Comparison of tablet computers
- Barnes & Noble Nook
- Kobo eReader
- Sony Reader
- Google Play Books
- Kindle Direct Publishing
