= Audible (service) =

Online audiobook and podcast service

Audible, Inc.
- Developer: Audible, a subsidiary of Amazon Entertainment, a division of Amazon
- Launched: 1995; 31 years ago
- Platforms: Fire OS, Android, iOS, macOS, Windows, web browser, Wear OS, WatchOS, Windows Phone
- Pricing model: Variable subscription and a la carte
- Website: www.audible.com

Audible is an American online audiobook and podcast service that allows users to purchase and stream audiobooks and other forms of spoken-word content. This content can be purchased individually or under a subscription model in which the user receives "credits" that can be redeemed for content monthly and receive access to a curated on-demand library of content. Audible is the United States' largest audiobook producer and retailer. The service is owned by Audible, a wholly owned subsidiary of Amazon Entertainment, a division of Amazon.com, Inc., headquartered in Newark, New Jersey.

== History ==
The company's first product was an eponymous portable media player known as the Audible MobilePlayer; released in 1997, the device contained around four megabytes of on-board flash memory storage, which could hold up to two hours of audio. To use the player, consumers would download an audiobook from the Audible website.

On March 11, 1999, Microsoft invested $11 million into the company. On October 24, 1999, Audible suffered a setback when its CEO, Andrew J. Huffman, died. Development proceeded, however, leading to Audible licensing the ACELP codec for its downloads in 2000, and Amazon bought a 5 percent stake in the then-publicly traded company the same year.

In 2003, Audible reached an agreement with Apple to be the exclusive provider of audiobooks for iTunes Music Store. This agreement ended in 2017 due to antitrust rulings in the European Union.

In 2005, the service released "Audible Air," which allowed users to download audiobooks directly to PDAs and smartphones. Its content would update automatically, downloading chapters as required that would then delete themselves after they had been listened to. In 2006, the company released its A-List collection, which had famous works read by Anne Hathaway and Annette Bening.

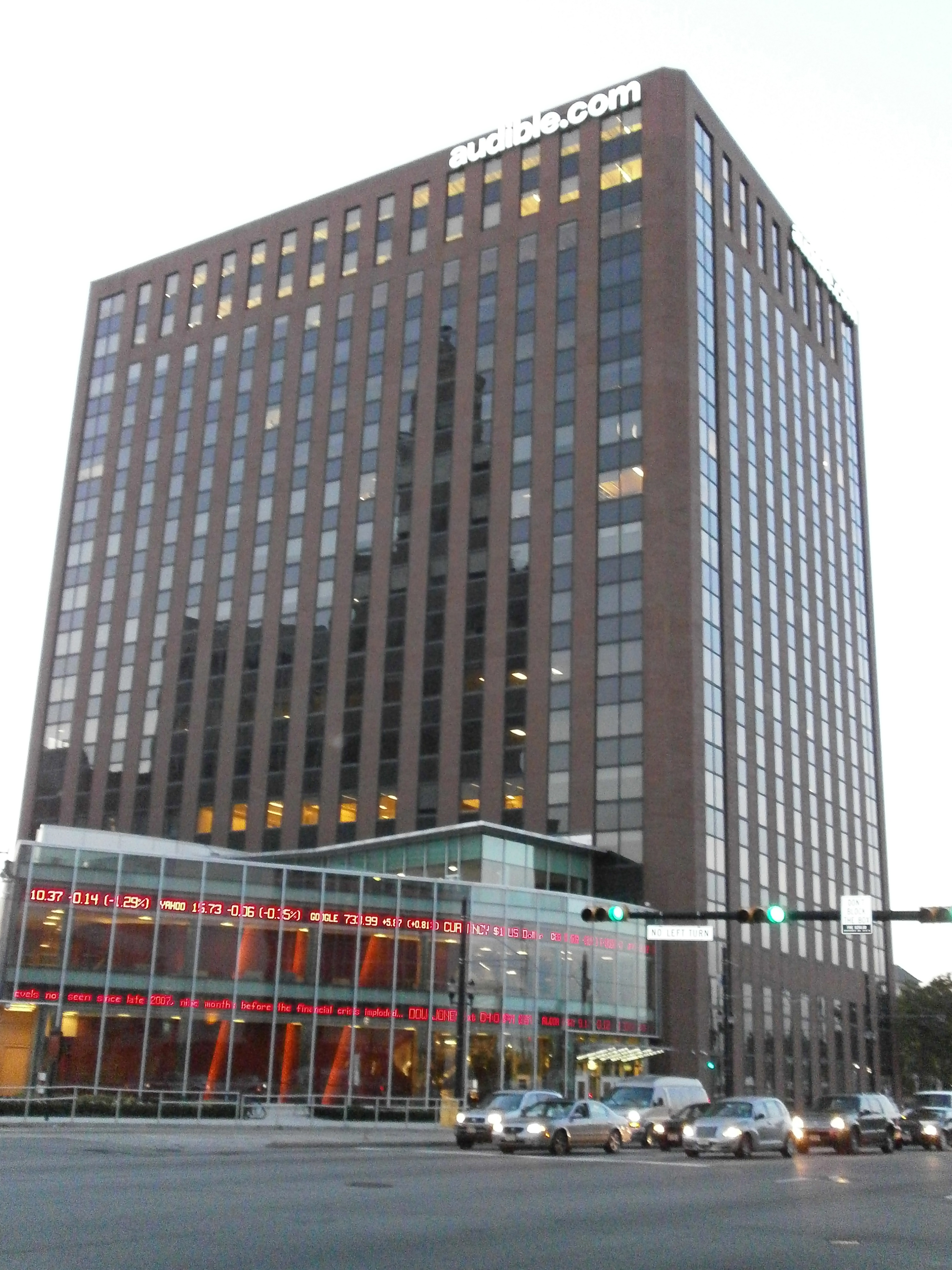
One Washington Park headquarters, in Newark, New Jersey

In 2007, CEO Donald Katz moved the company headquarters with 125 employees from suburban Wayne, New Jersey to Newark. The new headquarters was a high-rise building on One Washington Park.

On January 31, 2008, Amazon announced they would purchase Audible for about $300 million. In April of that year, Audible began producing exclusive science fiction and fantasy audiobooks under its "Audible Frontiers" imprint. At launch, 25 titles were released.

In May 2011, the service launched Audiobook Creation Exchange (ACX), an online rights marketplace and production platform. The platform was so successful that in 2012, Audible reported it had received more titles from ACX than from its top three audio providers combined. In March 2012, Audible launched the A-List Collection, a series showcasing Hollywood stars including Claire Danes, Colin Firth, Anne Hathaway, Dustin Hoffman, Samuel L. Jackson, Diane Keaton, Nicole Kidman, and Kate Winslet performing great works of literature. Firth's performance of Graham Greene's The End of the Affair was named Audiobook of the Year at the Audie Awards in 2013.

The service began offering its narration workshops at acting schools, including Juilliard and Tisch School of the Arts; in 2013, Audible's CEO speculated that the company was the largest single employer of actors in the New York area.

In September 2012, Audible introduced a feature known as "Whispersync for Voice," which allows users to continue audiobooks from where they left off reading them on Amazon Kindle.

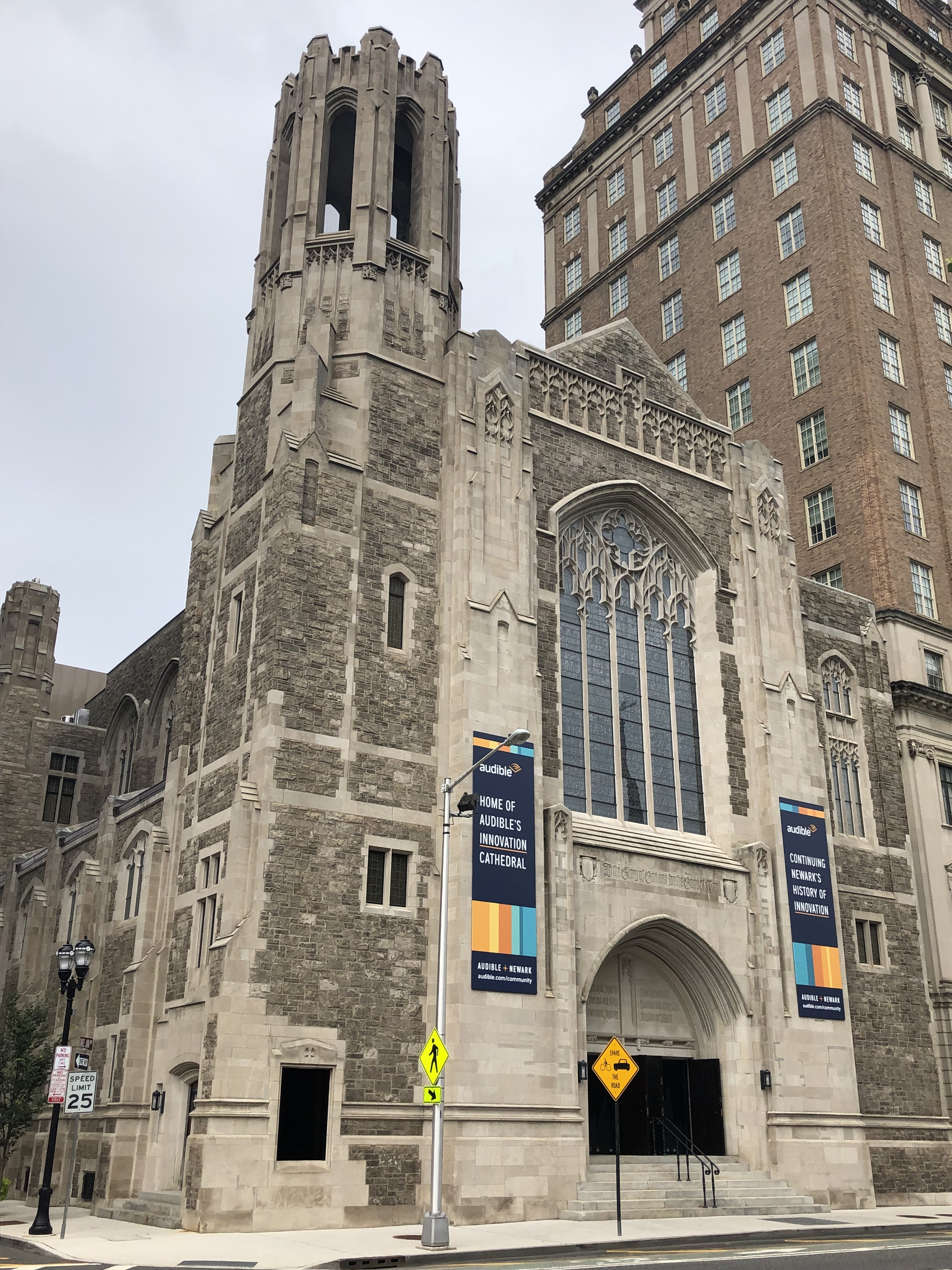
The former Second Presbyterian Church in Newark was repurposed as Audible's "Innovation Cathedral".

In 2016, the company announced that it would open a new facility in Newark, New Jersey, the "Innovation Cathedral," in a former Second Presbyterian Church, last used in 1995.

In July 2019, a new feature was announced called Audible Captions, in which machine-generated text would be displayed alongside the audio narration. The company was sued by the Association of American Publishers shortly thereafter for copyright violation. The lawsuit was settled in early 2020, with Audible agreeing not to implement the Captions feature without obtaining express permission.

In November 2020, Audible modified its return and exchange policy in response to concerns by authors, who felt that customers were abusing the policy to listen to audiobooks without paying.

== Content and pricing ==
Audible's content includes more than 200,000 audio programs from audiobook publishers, broadcasters, entertainers, magazine and newspaper publishers and business information providers. Content includes books of all genres, as well as radio shows (classic and current), speeches, interviews, stand-up comedy, and audio versions of periodicals such as The New York Times and The Wall Street Journal.

The service offered two monthly subscription tiers, "Audible Gold" and "Audible Platinum," priced at $14.95 and $22.95 USD respectively: Both services allow users to obtain credits which can be used to purchase audio books (one whole credit for Gold, and two whole credits on Platinum), while Platinum also included additional incentives such as exclusive discounts. On August 24, 2020, Audible replaced both plans with "Audible Premium Plus" (a renaming of Gold, though with the Platinum pricing and credits grandfathered for existing subscribers), and introduced a new $7.95 subscription tier known as "Audible Plus." Both tiers include access to a curated on-demand library of audiobooks, podcasts, and other original productions, while the Audible Plus tier does not include credits.

Once a customer has purchased a title, it remains in that person's library and can be downloaded or streamed at any time. As of April 1, 2019, credits expire one year after issue, and credits prior to this day expire after two years.

=== Original content ===
In May 2015, Audible hired Eric Nuzum, formerly VP of programming at NPR, as its SVP of original content development. He resigned in 2018 after the original podcast staff at Audible were laid off.

In 2016, the service introduced an on-demand service known as "Audible Channels", which features short-form audio programming from various outlets, including news and other original productions. Access is included as part of Audible's subscription, and also became available to Amazon Prime subscribers. Nuzum compared this strategy to original content created by HBO or Netflix, and stated that the service deliberately avoided use of the word "podcast" as to not alienate listeners unfamiliar with the concept.

Among its original productions are Where Should We Begin?, a relationship podcast with Esther Perel; Sincerely, X, a podcast featuring anonymous TED Talks; Ponzi Supernova, a chronicle of the Madoff investment scandal; The Butterfly Effect, a podcast series by Jon Ronson chronicling the impact of PornHub on internet pornography; and West Cork, a true crime podcast investigating an unsolved 1996 murder in West Cork, Ireland.

In August 2018, it was reported that Nuzum was stepping down, and that Amazon had laid off most of the short-form content staff. This move came amid a shift in Audible's original content strategy, including a greater focus on "audiobook-first" deals with writers.

The service added a new tier for subscribers to access Audible Originals, announced in fall 2020, called Premium Plus, including over 11,000 titles (as of the launch). These titles included earlier original material, plus new audio productions featuring such creators as Common, Jamie Lee Curtis, Kate Mara, Harvey Fierstein, Michael Caine and Jesse Eisenberg. More recent releases include Newark Mayor Ras Baraka's memoir and two works by Brown Sugar screenwriter Michael Elliot.

In 2024, Audible announced new audio projects including an audio adaptation of George Orwell's Nineteen Eighty-Four titled "1984" starring Andrew Garfield, Cynthia Erivo, Andrew Scott and Tom Hardy. Kerry Washington and Daniel Dae Kim performed main roles in an adaptation of the Broadway play David Henry Hwang's "Yellow Face" exploring themes of cultural appropriation.

== Device support ==
Similarly to other major app-based services in 2025, Audible has broad platform support for major platforms including Windows, Mac, iOS, Android, and Kindle, encompassing various brands of personal computers, mobile phones, and smart devices such as smart TVs, smart speakers, in-car entertainment systems, and accessibility devices.

Linux devices are not supported by Audible. Instead, users can use third-party software designed to play Audible's DRM-encoded file format (AAX) file format, such as OpenAudible, or break the DRM-encoding and convert the files into an open one, such as MP3.

For iOS devices, users can access Audible on the iPhone 6 and later, iPad mini 4 and later, and all macOS devices running macOS Ventura 13.3 or higher.

The Android app cannot be downloaded directly from Audible, but must be obtained via either Google Play or Galaxy Store. The software is compatible with Android OS 9.0 and above. As of October 2025, the latest version contains code signatures of four tracking companies.

For Windows devices, Audible provides the AudibleSync app, compatible with Windows 10 and Windows 11, which also allows for audiobook transfers to MP3 players and accessibility devices.

In addition to mobile and desktop devices, Audible supports Kindle devices, enabling audiobook playback directly on e-readers. Audible is also compatible with various accessibility devices for people with visual impairments or blindness, including Swiss engineering firm Bones AG's Milestone 212 and 312 and EssilorLuxottica Humanware's Victor Reader Stream 2 and 3.

== Quality ==
The following qualities have been available from Audible. Currently, only the "Format 4" and "Enhanced" formats are available for download.

Format name	Bitrate	Sample rate	Bit depth	Channel	MBytes/hour	Container	Quality description
Audible Enhanced Audio (.aax)	32–128 kbit/s	22.050–44.10 kHz	Unknown	Mono or stereo	28.8	MPEG-4 Part 14	AAC sound
Format 4 (.aa)	32 kbit/s	22.050 kHz	16 bit	Mono	14.4	MP3	MP3 sound
Format 3 (.aa)	16 kbit/s	22.050 kHz	16 bit	Mono	7.2	Unknown	FM radio sound
Format 2 (.aa)	8 kbit/s	22.050 kHz	16 bit	Mono	3.7	Unknown	AM radio sound

== Digital rights management ==
Audible's .aa file format encapsulates sound encoded in either MP3 or the ACELP speech codec, but includes unauthorized-playback prevention by means of an Audible username and password, which can be used on up to four computers and three smartphones at a time. Licenses are available for schools and libraries.

Audible's content can only be played on selected mobile devices. Its software does enable users to burn a limited number of CDs for unrestricted playback, resulting in CDs that can be copied or converted to unrestricted digital audio formats.

Because of the CD issue, Audible's use of digital rights management on its .aa format has earned it criticism. While multiple software products are capable of removing the Audible DRM protection by re-encoding in other formats, Audible has been quick to threaten the software makers with lawsuits for discussing or promoting this ability, as happened with River Past Corp and GoldWave Inc. Responses have varied, with River Past removing the capability from their software, and GoldWave retaining the capability, but censoring discussions about the ability in its support forums. But there are still many other software tools from non-US countries which easily bypass the DRM control of Audible by various methods, including sound recording, virtual CD burning, and even using a media plugin library once provided by Audible themselves. After Apple's abandonment of most DRM measures, Amazon's downloads ceasing to use it, Audible's DRM system is one of the few remaining in place.

Many Audible listings displayed to non-U.S. customers are geo-blocked. According to Audible, this is because the publisher who has provided the title does not have the rights to distribute the file in a given region. Logged in users are unable to see titles that are unavailable for purchase.

There were hopes that Amazon, after its purchase of Audible, would remove the DRM from its audiobook selection, in keeping with the current trend in the industry. Nevertheless, Audible's products continue to have DRM, similar to the policy of DRM-protecting their Kindle e-books, which have DRM that allows for a finite, yet undisclosed number of downloads at the discretion of the publisher, however Audible titles that are DRM free can be copied to the Kindle and made functional.

Audible is able to offer DRM-free titles for content providers who wish to do so. FFmpeg 2.8.1+ is capable of playing Audible's .aa and .aax file formats natively.

== Market power ==
Audible operates the Audiobook Creation Exchange, which enables individual authors or publishers to work with professional actors and producers to create audiobooks, which are then distributed to Amazon and iTunes. Currently, the service is available to residents of the United States, United Kingdom, Canada, and Ireland. Audible produces 10,000 titles a year and may be the largest employer of actors in New York City.

== See also ==
- RBMedia
- LibriVox
- Storytel
