= Audiobook Creation Exchange =

Audible.com audiobook service

Audiobook Creation Exchange (ACX)
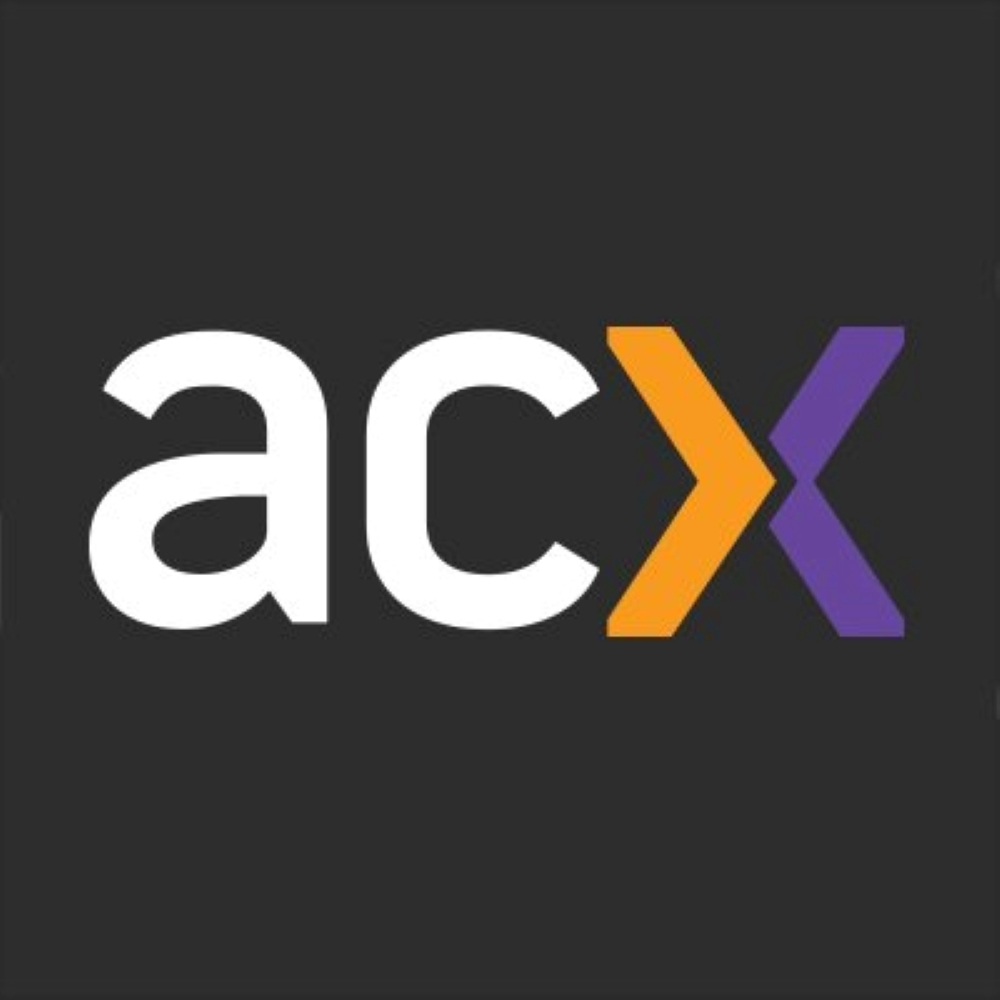
- Formation: 2011-5-12
- Owner: Audible
- Website: https://www.acx.com

Audiobook Creation Exchange (ACX) is a marketplace for professional narrators, authors, agents, publishers and rights holders to connect and create audiobooks. ACX was launched by Audible on May 12, 2011 by Don Katz and run by Jason Ojalvo. At the time of launching, Ojalvo reported the ACX had roughly 1000 titles.

== Overview ==
ACX is owned and operated by Audible Inc., an Amazon company. All titles produced through ACX are made available for sale on Audible.com, Amazon.com and iTunes.

On ACX, the customer signs in as either a producer of an audiobook or as someone who owns the rights to create an audiobook. On ACX, a producer is anyone who can deliver or help deliver a retail ready audiobook. This group includes recording studios, narrators, audio engineers and audiobook editors. Rights holders include anyone who owns the audio rights to a book: authors, narrators, literary agents, publishers, etc.

== History ==
In February 2012, ACX launched "DIY workflow". DIY allows users who own the audio rights to already completed audiobooks to upload them individually through ACX and have them distributed through Audible's sales channels.

In April 2013, ACX announced "Audible Author Services" which is an incentive program to distribute profits to audiobook authors. Authors who register receive $1 for each audiobook sold.

== See also ==
- Kindle Direct Publishing (KDP)
- CreateSpace
