= CreateSpace =

Self-publishing service

On-Demand Publishing, LLC
- Type: Subsidiary
- Industry: Publishing, Book publishing
- Predecessor: BookSurge Inc.; CustomFlix Labs Inc.
- Founded: July 14, 2000; 26 years ago in South Carolina, US
- Defunct: July 2018; 8 years ago
- Fate: Merged into Kindle Direct Publishing
- Headquarters: Scotts Valley, California, US
- Area served: Worldwide
- Parent: Amazon.com
- Website: www.createspace.com

On-Demand Publishing, LLC, doing business as CreateSpace, was a self-publishing service owned by Amazon. The company was founded in 2000 in South Carolina as BookSurge and acquired by Amazon in 2005.

== History ==
CreateSpace published books containing any content at all, other than just placeholder text. It neither edited nor verified. Books were printed on demand, meaning each volume was produced in response to an actual purchase on Amazon.

CreateSpace continued its publishing services for 8 years until its transfer to Amazon's Media on Demand. By 2018, it had published 1,416,384 books for over 15,000 authors.

In July 2018, CreateSpace announced it would be transferring media to Amazon's Media on Demand services in the following months. CreateSpace merged with Amazon's Kindle Direct Publishing (KDP) service later that year.

== See also ==
- Audiobook Creation Exchange (ACX)
