= Comparison of e-book formats =

The following is a comparison of e-book formats used to create and publish e-books.

The EPUB format is the most widely supported e-book format, supported by most e-book readers, including Kobo eReader devices, Amazon Kindle devices being an exception. Most e-book readers also support the PDF and plain text formats. E-book software, like the cross-platform Calibre, can be used to convert e-books from one format to another, as well as to create, edit and publish e-books.

== Format descriptions ==
Formats available include, but are not limited to:

=== Broadband eBooks (BBeB) ===
Format:	Sony media
Published as:	.lrf, .lrx

The digital book format originally used by Sony Corporation. It is a proprietary format, but some reader software for general-purpose computers, particularly under Linux (for example, Calibre's internal viewer), have the capability to read it. The LRX file extension represents a DRM-encrypted e-book. More recently, Sony has converted its books from BBeB to EPUB and is now issuing new titles in EPUB.

=== Comic Book Archive file ===
Format:	compressed images
Published as:	.cbr (RAR), .cbz (ZIP), .cb7 (7z), .cbt (TAR), .cba (ACE)

=== Compiled HTML ===
Format:	Microsoft Compiled HTML Help
Published as:	.chm

CHM format is a proprietary format based on HTML. Multiple pages and embedded graphics are distributed along with metadata as a single compressed file. The indexing is both for keywords and for full text search.

=== DAISY – ANSI/NISO Z39.86 ===
Format:	DAISY
Published as:

The Digital Accessible Information SYstem (DAISY) is an XML-based open standard published by the National Information Standards Organization (NISO) and maintained by the DAISY Consortium for people with print disabilities. DAISY has wide international support with features for multimedia, navigation and synchronization. A subset of the DAISY format has been adopted by law in the United States as the National Instructional Material Accessibility Standard (NIMAS), and K-12 textbooks and instructional materials are now required to be provided to students with disabilities.

DAISY is already aligned with the EPUB technical standard, and is expected to fully converge with its forthcoming EPUB3 revision.

=== Djvu ===
Format:	DjVu
Published as:	.djvu

DjVu is a format specialized for storing scanned documents. It includes advanced compressors optimized for low-color images, such as text documents. Individual files may contain one or more pages. DjVu files cannot be re-flowed.

The contained page images are divided in separate layers (such as multi-color, low-resolution, background layer using lossy compression, and few-colors, high-resolution, tightly compressed foreground layer), each compressed in the best available method. The format is designed to decompress very quickly, even faster than vector-based formats.

The advantage of DjVu is that it is possible to take a high-resolution scan (300–400 DPI), good enough for both on-screen reading and printing, and store it very efficiently. Provided the images are reasonably clean and the most aggressive compression settings are used, a couple hundred 600-DPI black-and-white text scans can be stored in less than a megabyte.

=== DOC ===
Format:	Microsoft Word
Published as:	.doc

DOC is a document file format that is directly supported by few e-book readers. Its advantages as an e-book format is that it can be easily converted to other e-book formats and it can be reflowed. It can be easily edited using Microsoft software, and any of several other programs. Note that the format has changed several times since its original release, and there are numerous incompatibility difficulties between various releases and the assorted programs which attempt to read / write the format.

=== DOCX ===
Format:	Microsoft Word (XML)
Published as:	.docx

DOCX is a document file format that is directly supported by few e-book readers. Its advantages as an e-book format are that it can be easily converted to other e-book formats and it can be reflowed. It can be easily edited.

=== EPUB ===
Format:	EPUB 3 (open eBook)
Published as:	.epub

The EPUB (formerly OEBPS) format is a technical standard for e-books created by the International Digital Publishing Forum (IDPF).

The format has gained mass popularity as the most popular vendor-independent XML-based e-book format. The format can be read by Kobo eReader devices, BlackBerry devices, Apple's Apple Books app running on Macintosh computers and iOS/iPadOS devices, Google Play Books app running on Android and iOS/iPadOS devices, Barnes & Noble Nook, Sony Reader, BeBook, Bookeen Cybook Gen3 (with firmware v2 and up), Adobe Digital Editions, Lexcycle Stanza, FBReader, PocketBook eReader, Aldiko, the Mozilla Firefox add-on EPUBReader, Lucifox, Okular and other reading apps. Amazon Kindle devices cannot read books in EPUB format, but Send to Kindle service can convert .epub files to Kindle File Format.

Adobe Digital Editions uses .epub format for its e-books, with digital rights management (DRM) protection provided through their proprietary ADEPT mechanism. The ADEPT framework and scripts have been reverse-engineered to circumvent this DRM system.

=== eReader ===
Format:	Palm Media
Published as:	.pdb

eReader is a freeware program for viewing Palm Digital Media electronic books which use the pdb format used by many Palm applications. Versions are available for Android, BlackBerry, iOS, Palm OS (not webOS), Symbian, Windows Mobile Pocket PC/Smartphone, and macOS. The reader shows text one page at a time, as paper books do. eReader supports embedded hyperlinks and images. Additionally, the Stanza application for the iPhone and iPod Touch can read both encrypted and unencrypted eReader files.

The program supports features like bookmarks and footnotes, enabling the user to mark any page with a bookmark and any part of the text with a footnote-like commentary. Footnotes can later be exported as a Memo document.

On July 20, 2009, Barnes & Noble made an announcement implying that eReader would be the company's preferred format to deliver e-books. Exactly three months later, in a press release by Adobe, it was revealed Barnes & Noble would be joining forces with the software company to standardize the EPUB and PDF e-book formats. Barnes & Noble e-books are now sold mostly in EPUB format.

=== FictionBook (fb2) ===
Format:	FictionBook
Published as:	.fb2

FictionBook is an XML-based e-book format, supported by free readers such as PocketBook eReader, FBReader, Okular, CoolReader, BeBook and STDU Viewer.

The FictionBook format does not specify the appearance of a document; instead, it describes its structure and semantics. All e-book metadata, such as the author name, title, and publisher, is also present in the file. Hence the format is convenient for automatic processing, indexing, and e-book collection management. This is also convenient for book storage for later automatic conversion into other formats.

=== Founder Electronics ===
Format:	Apabi Reader
Published as:	.xeb, .ceb

APABI is a format devised by Founder Electronics. It is a popular format for Chinese e-books. It can be read using the Apabi Reader software, and produced using Apabi Publisher. Both .xeb and .ceb files are encoded binary files. The ILiad e-book device includes an Apabi viewer.

=== Hypertext Markup Language ===
Format:	Hypertext
Published as:	.htm, .html (and typically auxiliary images), .js, .css

HTML is the markup language used for most web pages. E-books using HTML can be read using a Web browser. The specifications for the format are available without charge from the W3C.

HTML adds specially marked meta-elements to otherwise plain text encoded using character sets like ASCII or UTF-8. As such, suitably formatted files can be, and sometimes are, generated by hand using a plain text editor or programmer's editor. Many HTML generator applications exist to ease this process and often require less intricate knowledge of the format details involved.

HTML on its own is not a particularly efficient format to store information in, requiring more storage space for a given work than many other formats. However, several e-Book formats including the Amazon Kindle, Open eBook, Compiled HTML, Mobipocket and EPUB store each book chapter in HTML format, then use ZIP compression to compress the HTML data, images, metadata and style sheets into a single, significantly smaller, file.

HTML files encompass a wide range of standards and displaying HTML files correctly can be complicated. Additionally many of the features supported, such as forms, are not relevant to e-books.

=== iBook (Apple) ===
Format:	iBook
Published as:	.ibooks

The .ibooks format was created with the free iBooks Author e-book layout software from Apple Inc. This proprietary format was based on the EPUB standard, with some differences in the CSS tags used in an ibooks format file, this making it incompatible with the EPUB specification. The End-User Licensing Agreement (EULA) included with iBooks Author states that "If you want to charge a fee for a work that includes files in the .ibooks format generated using iBooks Author, you may only sell or distribute such work through Apple". The "through Apple" will typically be in the Apple Apple Books store. The EULA further states that "This restriction does not apply to the content of such works when distributed in a form that does not include files in the .ibooks format." Therefore, Apple did not included distribution restrictions in the iBooks Author EULA for ibooks format e-books created in iBooks Author that are made available for free, and it does not prevent authors from re-purposing the content in other e-book formats to be sold outside the iBookstore. The software supported import and export functionally for three formats. ibook, Plain text and PDF. Versions 2.3 and later of iBooks Author support importing EPUB and exporting EPUB 3.0.

=== IEC 62448 ===
Format:	IEC 62448
Published as:

IEC 62448 is an international standard created by International Electrotechnical Commission (IEC), Technical Committee 100, Technical Area 10 (Multimedia e-publishing and e-book).

The current version of IEC 62448 is an umbrella standard that contains as appendices two concrete formats, XMDF of Sharp and BBeB of Sony. However, BBeB has been discontinued by Sony and the version of XMDF that is in the specification is out of date. The IEC TA10 group is discussing the next steps, and has invited the IDPF organization which has standardized EPUB to be a liaison. It is possible that the current version of EPUB or the EPUB3 revision may be added to IEC 62448. Meanwhile, a number of Japanese companies have proposed that IEC standardize a proposed new Japanese-centric file format that is expected to unify DotBook of Voyager Japan and XMDF of Sharp. This new format has not been publicly disclosed as of November 2010 but it is supposed to cover basic representations for the Japanese language. Technically speaking, the revision is supposed to provide a Japanese minimum set, a Japanese extension set, and a stylesheet language. These issues were discussed in the TC100 meeting held in October 2010 but no decisions were taken besides offering the liaison status to IDPF.

=== INF (IBM) ===
Format:	IBM & open source
Published as:	.inf

IBM created this e-book format and used it extensively for OS/2 and other of its operating systems. The INF files were often digital versions of printed books that came with some bundles of OS/2 and other products. There were many other newsletters and monthly publications (e.g.: EDM/2) available in the INF format too.

The advantage of INF is that it is very compact and very fast. It also supports images, reflowed text, tables and various list formats. INF files get generated by compiling the markup text files — in the Information Presentation Facility (IPF) format — into binary files.

Originally only IBM created an INF viewer and compiler, but later open source viewers like NewView, DocView and others appeared. There is also an open source IPF compiler named WIPFC, created by the Open Watcom project.

=== Kindle (Amazon) ===
Format:	Kindle
Published as:	.azw, .azw3 or .kf8, .kfx

With the release of the Kindle Fire reader in late 2011, Amazon.com also released Kindle Format 8, also known as .azw3. The .azw3 file format supports a subset of HTML5 and CSS3 features, with some additional nonstandard features; the new data is stored within a container which can also be used to store a Mobi content document, allowing limited backwards compatibility.

Older Kindle e-readers use the proprietary format, AZW. It is based on the Mobipocket standard, with a slightly different serial number scheme (it uses an asterisk instead of a dollar sign) and its own DRM formatting. It also lacks some Mobipocket features such as JavaScript. .prc publications can be read directly on the Kindle.

Because e-books bought on the Kindle are delivered over its wireless system called Whispernet, the user does not see the AZW files during the download process. The Kindle format is available on a variety of platforms, such as through the Kindle app for the various mobile device platforms.

=== Microsoft LIT ===
Format:	Microsoft Reader
Published as:	.lit

DRM-protected LIT files are only readable in the proprietary Microsoft Reader program, as the .LIT format, otherwise similar to Microsoft's CHM format, includes DRM features. Other third-party readers, such as Lexcycle Stanza, can read unprotected LIT files.

The Microsoft Reader uses patented ClearType display technology. In Reader navigation works with a keyboard, mouse, stylus, or through electronic bookmarks. The Catalog Library records reader books in a personalized home page, and books are displayed with ClearType to improve readability. A user can add annotations and notes to any page, create large-print e-books with a single command, or create free-form drawings on the reader pages. A built-in dictionary allows the user to look up words.

In August 2011, Microsoft announced they were discontinuing both Microsoft Reader and the use of the .lit format for e-books at the end of August 2012, and ending sales of the format on November 8, 2011.

=== Mobipocket ===
Format:	Mobipocket
Published as:	.prc, .mobi

The Mobipocket e-book format is based on the Open eBook standard using XHTML and can include JavaScript and frames. It also supports native SQL queries to be used with embedded databases. There is a corresponding e-book reader.

The Mobipocket Reader has a home page library. Readers can add blank pages in any part of a book and add free-hand drawings. Annotations – highlights, bookmarks, corrections, notes, and drawings – can be applied, organized, and recalled from a single location. Images are converted to GIF format and have a maximum size of 64K, sufficient for mobile phones with small screens, but rather restrictive for newer gadgets. Mobipocket Reader has electronic bookmarks, and a built-in dictionary.

The reader has a full screen mode for reading and support for many PDAs, communicators, and smartphones. Mobipocket products support most Windows, Symbian, BlackBerry and Palm operating systems, but not the Android platform. Using WINE, the reader works under Linux or Mac OS X. Third-party applications like Okular, Calibre, and FBReader can also be used under Linux or Mac OS X, but they work only with unencrypted files.

The Amazon Kindle can read unprotected .mobi files, as can Amazon's Kindle application for Windows and MacOS. Amazon has also developed an .epub to .mobi converter called KindleGen, and it supports IDPF 1.0 and IDPF 2.0 EPUB format.

=== Multimedia e-books ===
Format:	Eveda
Published as:	.exe, .html

A multimedia e-book is media and book content that utilizes a combination of different book content formats. The term can be used as a noun (a medium with multiple content formats) or as an adjective describing a medium as having multiple content formats.

The term multimedia e-book is used in contrast to media which only utilize traditional forms of printed or text books. Multimedia e-books include a combination of text, audio, images, video, or interactive content formats. Much like how a traditional book can contain images to help the text tell a story, a multimedia e-book can contain other elements not formerly possible to help tell the story.

With the advent of more widespread tablet-like computers, such as the smartphone, some publishing houses were planning to make multimedia ebooks, such as Penguin.

=== Newton Digital Book ===
Format:	Newton Digital Book
Published as:	.pkg

Commonly known as a Newton Book, but officially referred to as a Newton Digital Book; a single Newton package file can contain multiple books (for example, the three books of a trilogy might be packaged together). Newton Books are created using Newton Press, or, for more advanced content, Newton Book Maker and Newton Toolkit.

All systems running the Newton operating system (the most common include the Newton MessagePads, eMates, Siemens Secretary Stations, Motorola Marcos, Digital Ocean Seahorses and Tarpons) have built-in support for viewing Newton books, through a system service known as Newton Book Reader. The Newton package format was released to the public by Newton, Inc. prior to that company's absorption into Apple Computer. The format is thus arguably open and various people have written readers for it (writing a Newton book converter has even been assigned as a university-level class project).

Newton books have no support for DRM or encryption. They do support internal links, potentially multiple tables of contents and indexes, embedded gray scale images, and even some scripting capability using NewtonScript (for example, it's possible to make a book in which the reader can influence the outcome). Newton books utilize Unicode and are thus available in numerous languages. An individual Newton Book may actually contain multiple views representing the same content in different ways (such as for different screen resolutions).

=== Open Packaging Format ===
Format:	Open eBook
Published as:	.opf

OPF is an XML-based e-book format created by E-Book Systems; it has been superseded by the EPUB electronic publication standard.

=== Portable Document Format ===
Format:	Portable Document Format
Published as:	.pdf

Invented by Adobe Systems, and first released in 1993, PDF became ISO 32000 in 2008. The format was developed to provide a platform-independent means of exchanging fixed-layout documents. Derived from PostScript, but without language features like loops, PDF adds support for features such as compression, passwords, semantic structures and DRM. Because PDF documents can easily be viewed and printed by users on a variety of computer platforms, they are very common on the Internet and in document management systems worldwide. The current PDF specification, ISO 32000-1:2008, is available from ISO's website, and under special arrangement, without charge from Adobe.

Because the format is designed to reproduce fixed-layout pages, re-flowing text to fit mobile device and e-book reader screens has traditionally been problematic. This limitation was addressed in 2001 with the release of PDF Reference 1.5 and Tagged PDF, but third-party support for this feature was limited until the release of PDF/UA in 2012.

Many products support creating and reading PDF files, such as Adobe Acrobat, PDFCreator and LibreOffice, and several programming libraries such as iText, Open PDF, and FOP. Third-party viewers such as xpdf and Nitro PDF are also available. Mac OS X has built-in PDF support, both for creation as part of the printing system and for display using the built-in Preview application.

Older PDF files are supported by almost all modern e-book readers, tablets and smartphones. Newer PDF files may not display properly on older e-readers, may not open, or may crash them. However, PDF reflow based on Tagged PDF, as opposed to re-flow based on the actual sequence of objects in the content-stream, is not yet commonly supported on mobile devices. Such Re-flow options as may exist are usually found under "view" options, and may be called "word-wrap".

=== Plain text ===
Format:	text
Published as:	.txt

The first e-books were in plain text .txt format, supplied for free by the Project Gutenberg community, but the format itself existed before e-books. The plain text format doesn't support DRM or formatting options (such as different fonts, graphics or colors). It has excellent portability as it is the simplest e-book encoding possible; a plain text file contains only ASCII or Unicode text (text files with UTF-8 or UTF-16 encoding are also popular for languages other than English). Almost all operating systems can read ASCII text files (e.g. Unix, Macintosh, Microsoft Windows, DOS and other systems) and newer operating systems support Unicode text files as well. The only potential for portability problems of ASCII text files is that operating systems differ in their preferred line-ending convention and their interpretation of values outside the ASCII range (their character encoding). Conversion of files from one to another line-ending convention is easy with free software. DOS and Windows use CRLF, Unix and Apple's macOS use LF, and Mac OS up to and including OS 9 uses CR. By convention, lines are often broken to fit into 80 characters, a legacy of older terminals and consoles. Alternately, each paragraph may be a single line.

When Unicode is not in use, the size in bytes of a text file is simply the number of characters, including spaces, and with a new line counting for 1 or 2. For example, the Bible, which is approximately 800,000 words, is about 4 MB.

=== Plucker ===
Format:	Plucker
Published as:	.pdb

Plucker is a free and open-source mobile and desktop e-book reader application with its own associated file format and software to automatically generate Plucker files from text, PDF, HTML, or other document format files, web sites or RSS feeds. The format is public and well-documented. Free readers are available for all kinds of desktop computers and many PDAs.

=== PostScript ===
Format:	PostScript
Published as:	.ps

PostScript is a page description language used in the electronic and desktop publishing areas for defining the contents and layout of a printed page, which can be used by a rendering program to assemble and create the actual output bitmap. Many office printers directly support interpreting PostScript and printing the result. As a result, the format also sees wide use in the Unix world.

=== RTF ===
Format:	Rich Text Format
Published as:	.rtf

Rich Text Format is a document file format that is supported by many e-book readers. Its advantages as an e-book format are that it is widely supported, and it can be reflowed. It can be easily edited. It can be easily converted to other e-book formats, increasing its support.

=== SSReader ===
Format:	SSReader
Published as:	.pdg

The digital book format used by the digital library company Chaoxing Digital Library (超星数字图书馆) in China. It is a proprietary raster image compression and binding format, with reading time OCR plug-in modules. The company scanned a large number of Chinese books from the National Library of China, which became the major stock of their service. The detailed format is not published. There are also other commercial e-book formats used in Chinese digital libraries.

=== Text Encoding Initiative ===
Format:	TEI Lite
Published as:	.xml

TEI Lite is the most popular of the TEI-based (and thus XML-based or SGML-based) electronic text formats.

=== TomeRaider ===
Format:	TomeRaider
Published as:	.tr, .tr2, .tr3

The TomeRaider e-book format is a proprietary format. There are versions of the format for Windows, Windows Mobile (aka Pocket PC), Palm, Symbian and iPhone. Capabilities of the TomeRaider3 e-book reader vary considerably per platform: the Windows and Windows Mobile editions support full HTML and CSS. The Palm edition supports limited HTML (e.g. no tables or fonts), and CSS support is missing. For Symbian there is only the older TomeRaider2 format, which does not render images or offer category search facilities. Despite these differences any TomeRaider e-book can be browsed on all supported platforms. The TomeRaider website claims to have over 4000 e-books available, including free versions of the Internet Movie Database (IMDb) and Wikipedia.

=== Open XML Paper Specification ===
Format:	OpenXPS
Published as:	.oxps, .xps

Open XML Paper Specification (also referred to as OpenXPS) is an open specification for a page description language and a fixed-document format. Microsoft developed it as the XML Paper Specification (XPS). In June 2009, Ecma International adopted it as international standard ECMA-388.

The format is intentionally restricted to sequences of glyphs (fixed runs of text), paths (geometry that can be filled, or stroked, by a brush), and brushes (descriptions of shaped brushes used to render paths).

This reduces the possibility of inadvertent introduction of malicious content and simplifies the implementation of compatible renderers.

== Comparison ==
=== Features ===
Feature Format	Filename extension	DRM	Images	Tables	Sound	Inter-activity	Word wrap	Open standard	Annotation	Book-marks	Videos
Comic book archive	.cbr, .cbz, .cb7, .cbt, .cba	?	Yes	No	No	No	No	Yes	No	No	No
DjVu	.djvu	?	Yes	Yes	No	No	No	Yes	Yes	Yes	No
DOC	.doc	?	Yes	Yes	Yes	?	Yes	No	?	?	Yes
DOCX	.docx	?	Yes	Yes	Yes	?	Yes	Yes	Yes	?	Yes
EPUB	.epub	Yes	Yes	Yes	Yes	Yes	Yes	Yes	Yes/No (Note: Depends on the eReader application)	Yes/No	Yes (Note: With ePub 3)
FictionBook	.fb2	No	Yes	Yes/No (Note: Table support added in FictionBook V2.1. Not supported in V2.0)	No	No	Yes	Yes	Yes	?	?
HTML	.html	No	Yes	Yes	Yes (Note: With HTML 5)	No	Yes	Yes	No	No	Yes
Apple Books	.ibook	Yes	Yes	Yes	Yes	Yes	Yes	No	Yes	Yes	Yes
INF	.inf	No	Yes	Yes	No	?	Yes	Yes	Yes/No	Yes/No	No
Kindle	.azw, .azw3, .kfx	Yes	Yes	Yes (Note: Supported in all except 1st Generation Kindle. (Support level is as it is in mobipocket))	Yes (Note: Supported only in kindle for iPhone, iPod, iPad.)	Yes	Yes	No	Yes	Yes	Yes
Microsoft Reader	.lit	Yes	Yes	?	No	No	Yes	No	?	Yes	?
Mobipocket	.prc, .mobi	Yes	Yes	Yes	No	Yes	Yes	No	Yes	Yes	?
Multimedia e-book	.exe, .html	Yes	Yes	?	Yes	Yes	No	Yes	Yes	Yes	?
Newton Book	.pkg	No	Yes	Yes	No	Yes	Yes	Yes	Yes	Yes	No
eReader	.pdb	Yes	Yes	?	No	No	Yes	No	Yes	Yes	?
Plain text file	.txt	No	No	No	No	No	Yes	Yes	No	No	No
Plucker	.pdb	Yes	Yes	Yes	No	Yes	Yes	Yes	No	Yes	?
Portable Document Format	.pdf	Yes	Yes	Yes	Yes	Yes	Yes/No (Note: Reflow is implemented by some readers.)	Yes	Yes	Yes	Yes (Note: With Flash Embedded)
PostScript	.ps	No	Yes	?	No	No	Yes/No (Note: PostScript programs may implement word wrap; this depends on if the writer of the .ps file implemented it. Word wrap is not a built-in feature of PostScript.)	Yes	?	?	No
Tome Raider	.tr2, .tr3	Yes	Yes	?	No	No	Yes	No	?	?	?
OpenXPS	.oxps, .xps	?	Yes	Yes	?	No	No	Yes	?	?	?

=== Supporting platforms ===
Format Reader	TXT	PDF	EPUB	HTML	MOBI	FB2	DjVu	BBeB (Note: Proprietary format)	PDB	Kindle	.wol	.tr2	OEB (Note: Predecessor of EPUB)	CBR	OXPS
Amazon Kindle 1	Yes	No	No	No	Yes	No	No	No	No	Yes	No	No	No	?	?
Aluratek Libre Ereader Pro	Yes	Yes	Yes	No	Yes	Yes	No	No	No	No	No	No	No	?	?
Amazon Kindle 2, DX	Yes	Yes	No	Yes	Yes	No	No	No	No	Yes	No	No	No	?	?
Amazon Kindle 3	Yes	Yes	No (Note: Yes, if the Duokan alternate Kindle OS (third-party software add-on) is used.)	Yes	Yes	No	No	No	No	Yes	No	No	No	?	?
Amazon Kindle Fire	Yes	Yes	Yes (Note: By adding epub capable apps, such as Aldiko)	Yes	Yes	No	No	No	No	Yes	No	No	No	?	?
Android devices	Yes	Yes	Yes	Yes	Yes (Note: Requires latest firmware)	Yes	Yes	No	Yes	Yes	No	Yes	Yes	Yes (Note: With third party apps)	Yes
Apple iOS/iPadOS devices	Yes	Yes	Yes	Yes	Yes	Yes	Yes	No	Yes	Yes	No	Yes	Yes	Yes	?
Azbooka WISEreader	Yes	No	Yes	Yes	Yes	Yes	No	No	No	No	No	No	No	?	?
Barnes & Noble Nook	Yes	Yes	Yes	Yes	No	No	No	No	Yes	No	No	No	No	?	?
Nook Color	Yes	Yes	Yes	Yes	No	No	No	No	No	No	No	No	No	?	?
Cybook Gen3, Opus	Yes	Yes	Yes (Note: Versions support either EPUB or MobiPocket)	Yes	Yes	Yes (Note: Only EPUB version and with FW 2.0+)	No	No	No	No	No	No	Yes	?	?
COOL-ER Classic	Yes	Yes	Yes	Yes	Yes	Yes	No	No	No	No	No	No	No	?	?
Linux operating system	Yes	Yes	Yes	Yes	Yes	Yes (Note: KDE's Okular supports fb2)	Yes	Yes (Note: Calibre supports lrf/lrx)	Partial	Partial	Partial	Partial	Partial	Yes	Yes
Foxit eSlick	Yes	Yes	Yes	No	No	No	No	No	Yes	No	No	No	No	?	?
Hanlin eReader V3	Yes	Yes	Yes	Yes	Yes	Yes	Yes	No	No	No	Yes	No	No	?	?
Hanvon WISEreader	Yes	Yes	Yes	Yes	No	No	No	No	No	No	No	No	No	?	?
iRex iLiad	Yes	Yes	Yes	No	Yes	No	Yes	No	No	No	No	No	No	?	?
IRiver Story	Yes	Yes	Yes	No	No	Yes	Yes	No	No	No	No	No	No	?	?
Kobo eReader	Yes	Yes	Yes	Yes	Yes	No	No	No	No	No	No	No	No	Yes	?
Nokia N900	Yes	Yes	Yes	Yes	Yes	Yes	Yes	No	No	No	No	No	Yes	Yes	?
NUUTbook 2	Yes	Yes	Yes	No	No	No	No	No	No	No	No	No	No	?	?
OLPC XO, Sugar	Yes	Yes	Yes	Yes	No	No	Yes	No	No	No	No	No	No	?	?
Onyx Boox 60	Yes	Yes	Yes	Yes	Yes	Yes	Yes	No	No	No	No	No	No	?	?
Mac OS X	Yes	Yes	Yes	Yes	Yes	Yes	Yes	?	Yes	Yes	?	?	Yes	?	?
TrekStor Pyrus	Yes	Yes	Yes	No	No	Yes	Yes	No	Yes	No	No	No	?	?	?
Windows	Yes	Yes	Yes	Yes	Yes	Yes (Note: ICE Book Reader for Windows supports fb2)	Yes	?	Yes	Yes (Note: DRM-protected publications are supported as of Kindle for PC v1.3.0)	?	?	Yes	Yes (Note: Comic Book Reader for Windows)	Yes (Note: XP or later, not on Windows 2000)
Pocketbook 301 Plus, 302, 360°	Yes	Yes	Yes	Yes	Yes	Yes	Yes	No	No	No	No	No	No	?	?
Pocketbook Aqua	Yes	Yes	Yes	Yes	Yes	Yes	Yes	No	No	No	No	No	No	?	?
Sony Reader	Yes	Yes	Yes	No	No	No	No	Yes	No	No	No	No	No	?	?
Viewsonic VEB612	Yes	Yes	Yes	Yes	Yes	No	No	No	No	No	No	No	No	?	?
Windows Phone 7	Yes	Yes	Yes	Yes	No	No	No	No	No	Yes	No	No	No	?	?

== See also ==
- Comparison of e-readers
- Comparison of Android e-reader software – includes software e-book readers for Android devices
- Comparison of iOS e-reader software – includes software e-book readers for iOS devices
