= Comparison of Android e-reader software =

The following tables detail e-book reader software for the Android operating system. Each section corresponds to a major area of functionality in an e-book reader software. The comparisons are based on the latest released version.

== Software reading systems ==
Software	License	Other platforms	DRM formats supported
Aldiko	Proprietary	iOS	Adobe DRM
FBReader	Proprietary	Windows, Linux, iOS, Mac OS X	Readium LCP
Google Play Books	Proprietary	Web application, iOS	Adobe DRM
Kindle	Proprietary	Web application, iOS, BlackBerry, Mac OS X, Windows	Amazon DRM
Lektz	Proprietary	Web application, Mac OS X, iOS, Windows	Lektz DRM
OverDrive Media Console	Proprietary	Chromebook, iOS, Mac OS X, Windows	Adobe DRM, OverDrive

== File formats supported ==
See Comparison of e-book formats for details on the file formats.

Product	Formats total #	.cbr	.cbz	.chm	.djvu	.epub	.fb2	.html	.mobi	.oeb	.rtf	.pdf	.txt	.doc	.docx	.pdb
Aldiko Book Reader	02+	?	?	No	No	Yes	No	No	No	No	No	Yes	No	?	?	?
Cool Reader	07+	?	?	Yes	No	Yes	Yes	Yes	Yes	No	Yes	No	Yes	Yes	No	Yes
FBReader	11+	Yes	Yes	No	Plugin	Yes	Yes	Yes	Yes	Yes	Yes	Plugin	Yes	Yes	No	Yes
Google Play Books	02+	?	?	No	No	Yes	No	No	No	No	No	Yes	No	No	No	No
Kindle	02+	?	?	No	No	No	No	No	Yes	No	No	Yes	Yes	Yes	?	?
Lektz eBook Reader	02+	?	?	No	No	Yes	No	No	No	No	No	Yes	No	?	?	?
Product	Formats total #	.cbr	.cbz	.chm	.djvu	.epub	.fb2	.html	.mobi	.oeb	.rtf	.pdf	.txt	.doc	.docx	.pdb

== Navigation features ==
Product	Paging touch screen	Paging volume key	Backward-forward	Contents table	Bookmarks	Resume	Go to	Search full text	Sync to cloud	Autoscroll by pixel	Autoscroll by line	Autoscroll by page	Scroll speed control	Rolling blind mode	Continuous scrolling
Aldiko Book Reader	Yes	Yes	Yes	Yes	Yes	Yes	Yes	Yes	?	No	No	No	No	No	?
Cool Reader	Yes	Yes	Yes	Yes	Yes	Yes	Yes	Yes	?	?	?	?	?	?	Yes
FBReader	Yes	Yes	Yes	Yes	Yes	Yes	Yes	Yes	Yes	No	No	No	No	No	No
Google Play Books	Yes	Yes	Yes	Yes	Yes	Yes	Yes	Yes	Yes	?	?	?	?	?	No
Kindle	Yes	Yes	Yes	Yes	Yes	Yes	Yes	Yes	Yes	?	?	?	?	?	No
Lektz eBook Reader	Yes	No	Yes	Yes	Yes	Yes	Yes	Yes	Yes	No	No	No	No	No	?
Product	Paging touch screen	Paging volume key	Backward-forward	Contents table	Bookmarks	Resume	Go to	Search full text	Sync to cloud	Autoscroll by pixel	Autoscroll by line	Autoscroll by page	Scroll speed control	Rolling blind mode	Continuous scrolling

== Display features ==
Product	Theme	Day-night mode	Brightness control	Adjust to display size	Indent paragraph	Trim extra blank spaces	Enable-disable CSS	Customize text alignment	Customize font scale	Customize line space	Customize color	Customize transparent	Fading edge	Simulate real page flip	Image view with zoom/pan
Aldiko Book Reader	Yes	Yes	Yes	Yes	No	No	Yes	Yes	Yes	Yes	Yes	No	No	No	No
Cool Reader	?	Yes	Yes	Yes	Yes	?	Yes	Yes	Yes	Yes	Yes	?	?	Yes	?
FBReader	Yes	Yes	Yes	Yes	Yes	Yes	No enable/disable CCS » YES	Yes	Yes	Yes	Yes	Yes	Yes	Yes	Yes
Google Play Books	?	Yes	Yes	Yes	?	?	?	Yes	Yes	Yes	?	?	Yes	?	?
Kindle	?	Yes	Yes	?	?	?	?	?	Yes	Yes	?	?	?	?	?
Lektz eBook Reader	Yes	Yes	Yes	Yes	No	No	No	Yes	Yes	No	No	No	No	No	?
OverDrive Media Console	Yes	Yes	Yes	Yes	?	?	?	?	Yes	Yes	Yes	?	?	No	Yes
Product	Theme	Day-night mode	Brightness control	Adjust to display size	Indent paragraph	Trim extra blank spaces	Enable-disable CSS	Customize text alignment	Customize font scale	Customize line space	Customize color	Customize transparent	Fading edge	Simulate real page flip	Image view with zoom/pan

== Edit-tool features ==
Product	Highlight	Annotate	Metadata edit	Dictionary online	Dictionary offline	Wikipedia lookup	Translate	Share	Gesture command	Support DRM
Aldiko Book Reader	Yes	Yes	Yes	Yes	No	Yes	No	Yes	No	Yes
Cool Reader	Yes	Yes	Yes	Yes	Yes	?	Yes	Yes	Yes	No
FBReader	No	No	Yes	No	Yes	No	No	Yes	No	No
Kindle	Yes	Yes	?	Yes	Yes	Yes	Yes	Yes	Yes	Yes
Lektz eBook Reader	No	Yes	Yes	Yes	No	No	No	Yes	Yes	Yes
Product	Highlight	Annotate	Metadata edit	Dictionary online	Dictionary offline	Wikipedia lookup	Translate	Share	Gesture command	Support DRM

== Book source management features ==
Product	Local books	Book file search	Epub downloading	Browser downloading	OPDS catalog	Books tag	Books sort	Books manage metadata
Aldiko Book Reader	No	Yes	No	No	No	No	No	No
Cool Reader	No	No	No	Yes	No	No	No	No
FBReader	No	Yes	No	No	No	No	No	No
Kindle	Yes	Yes	Yes	Yes	Yes	Yes	Yes	Yes
Lektz eBook Reader	No	No	No	Yes	Yes	Yes	Yes	Yes
Product	Local books	Book file search	Epub downloading	Browser downloading	OPDS catalog	Books tag	Books sort	Books manage metadata

== Text To Speech features ==
Product	TTS Support (read aloud)	Android TTS engines Support	Cloud TTS engines Support	Translate and read translation	Resume reading	Jump Ahead / Jump Back	Jump to any location	Sleep timer	Voice effects	Read with screen off	Automatic language detection	Control speech speed	Adjustable pause after sentence	Adjustable pause in sentence	Android Auto integration
Aldiko Book Reader	No	?	?	No	?	?	?	?	?	?	?	?	?	?	No
Cool Reader	Yes	?	?	No	?	?	?	?	?	?	?	?	?	?	No
FBReader	Plugin	?	?	No	?	?	?	?	?	?	?	?	?	?	No
Kindle	?	?	?	No	?	?	?	?	?	?	?	?	?	?	No
Lektz eBook Reader	?	?	?	No	?	?	?	?	?	?	?	?	?	?	No
Product	TTS Support (read aloud)	Android TTS engines Support	Cloud TTS engines Support	Translate and read translation	Resume reading	Jump Ahead / Jump Back	Jump to any location	Sleep timer	Voice effects	Read with screen off	Automatic language detection	Control speech speed	Adjustable pause after sentence	Adjustable pause in sentence	Android Auto integration

== Other software e-book readers for Android ==
Other e-book readers for Android devices include: BookShout!, Nook e-Reader applications for third party devices and OverDrive Media Console. Additionally, Palmbookreader reads some formats (such as PDB and TXT) on Palm OS and Android devices. The Readmill app, introduced in February 2011, reads numerous formats on Android and iOS devices but shut down July 1, 2014. Another popular app Bluefire Reader was removed from Google Play Store in 2019.

== See also ==
- Comparison of e-readers - includes both device and software formats
- Comparison of e-book readers - includes hardware e-book readers
- Comparison of iOS e-reader software
