= Open eBook =

E-Book format

Open eBook Publication Structure (OEBPS)
- Filename extension: .opf
- Internet media type: application/oebps-package+xml
- Developed by: Open eBook Forum
- Initial release: 1999; 27 years ago
- Latest release: Open eBook Publication Structure (OEBPS) 2.0; September 2007
- Type of format: e-Book file format
- Contained by: OEB Package Format (ZIP)
- Extended from: XML, defined subset of XHTML, CSS, Dublin Core
- Extended to: EPUB electronic publication standard
- Website: idpf.org

Open eBook (OEB), or formally, the Open eBook Publication Structure (OEBPS), is a legacy e-book format which has been superseded by the EPUB format. It was "based primarily on technology developed by SoftBook Press" and on XML. OEB was released with a free version belonging to public domain and a full version to be used with or without DRM by the publishing industry.

Open eBook is a ZIP file plus a Manifest file. Inside the package a defined subset of XHTML may be used, along with CSS and Dublin Core metadata. The default file extension is .opf (OEB Package Format).

== Specification release history ==
- September 1999 – Open eBook Publication Structure (OEBPS) 1.0 released
- June 2001 – OEBPS 1.0.1 replaces OEBPS 1.0
- August 2002 – OEBPS 1.2 Recommended Specification Released
- September 2007 – Open Publication Structure (OPS) 2.0, EPUB. Released, supersedes the OEBPS 1.2

== Reader software ==
- SoftBook
- Adobe Digital Editions
- FBReader – GPL e-book reader for Unix/Windows computers.
- Lexcycle Stanza
- Mobipocket
- Openberg Lector – cross-platform reader released under the GPL and based on Mozilla platform

== Reader devices ==
- SoftBook
- Sony Reader – As of 2008 the Sony Reader PRS-505 supports the EPUB file format.
- Intel Reader
- Barnes & Noble Nook
- Kobo eReader

== See also ==
- Comparison of e-book formats
- Open Packaging Conventions
