= Treadmill (disambiguation) =

A treadmill is an exercise machine for running or walking while staying in one place

Treadmill or treadmilling may also refer to:

== Devices ==
- Hamster treadmill, a wheel found in a rodent's cage
- Omnidirectional treadmill, a device that allows a person to perform locomotive motion in any direction
- Penal treadmill, a treadmill that was used to extract labor from prisoners in Victorian prisons

== Science ==
- Euphemism treadmill, in sociolinguistics the tendency for euphemisms to become dysphemisms
- Hedonic treadmill, in positive psychology the tendency of a person to remain at a relatively stable level of happiness despite changes in fortune or the achievement of major goals
- Treadmilling, in molecular biology a phenomenon observed in many cellular cytoskeletal filaments

== Places ==
- Treadmill Ridge, a mountain located on the border of Alberta and British Columbia

== Fiction ==
- Cosmic treadmill, a fictional time travel device in the DC Comics universe

== See also ==
- Readmill, an ereader app available February 2011-July 2014
- Treadwheel
