= Readium LCP =

Digital rights management system

Readium Foundation
- Formation: 2018; 8 years ago
- Purpose: Digital rights management
- Board of directors: Laurent Le Meur; Risa Wolf; Brian O’Leary; Hadrien Gardeur; Robert Cartolano
- Website: readium.org

Readium LCP
- Filename extension: .lcpl
- Developed by: Readium Foundation
- Type of format: Ebook
- Contained by: EPUB
- Extended from: JSON, XML
- Standard: ISO/IEC 23078-2:2024
- Open format?: Yes
- Free format?: Yes
- Website: readium.org/lcp-specs/

Readium LCP is an open standard for a digital rights management (DRM) system for ebooks by Readium Foundation. It supports the EPUB publication format. It uses AES-256 encryption with SHA-2 hashing. It uses X.509 digital certificates. It has SDK for Swift and Kotlin.

The project got financial help from Korea Copyright Commission (KCC).

Internet Archive is lending LCP-protected ebooks. Instituto Cervantes has Spanish courses. BiblioVault serves 90 scholarly presses.

== Hardware ==
- Bookeen
- PocketBook International

== Software ==
- Bibblix by Stockholm Public Library
- FBReader
- Thorium Reader by EDRLab

== Lending ==
- Bibliopresto operates pretnumerique.ca
- MLOL Medialibrary online

== Stores ==
- Beleven
- Bokus
- Glassboxx
- ePagine
- Readino

== See also ==
- Comparison of e-book formats
- Adobe Digital Editions (ADE)
- Digital Accessible Information System (DAISY)
- Open Publication Distribution System (OPDS)
