= E-reader (disambiguation) =

An e-reader is a device or computer program used for reading electronic books.

E-reader may also refer to:

- eReader (format), a file format for e-books
- Nintendo e-Reader, an add-on for the Game Boy Advance portable video game system
- A person who reads e-books
