= Kindle File Format =

E-book file format

- Filename extension: .azw, .azw3, .kfx
- Internet media type: application/vnd.amazon.mobi8-ebook
- Developed by: Amazon.com
- Initial release: 2007
- Latest release: 10; 11 August 2015
- Type of format: e-book file format
- Extended from: HTML5, CSS3, MOBI
- Open format?: No

Kindle File Format is a proprietary e-book file format created by Amazon.com that can be downloaded and read on devices like smartphones, tablets, computers, or e-readers that have Amazon's Kindle app. E-book files in the Kindle File Format originally had the filename extension .azw; (Note: .azw expands into AmaZon Word) version 8 (KF8) introduced HTML5 & CSS3 features and had the .azw3 extension; and version 10 introduced a new typesetting and layout engine featuring hyphens, kerning and ligatures and has the .kfx extension.

== History ==
Kindle devices and apps are designed to use Amazon's e-book formats: AZW that is based on Mobipocket; in fourth generation and later Kindles, AZW3, also called KF8; and in seventh generation and later Kindles, KFX. Similar to EPUB, Amazon's file formats are intended for reflowable, richly formatted e-book content and support DRM restrictions, but unlike EPUB, they are proprietary formats. AZW files debuted with the first Amazon Kindle in 2007.

Software such as the free and open source Calibre, Amazon's KindleGen, and the email based Send-to-Kindle service are available to convert e-books into supported Kindle file formats. Kindle devices can also display some generic document formats such as plain text. (TXT) Portable Document Format (PDF) files are also supported, however, reflowing is not supported for these file types.

In late 2011, the Kindle Fire introduced "Kindle Format 8" (KF8), also known as AZW3 file format. AZW3 supports a subset of HTML5 and CSS3 features, while acting as a container for a backwards-compatible MOBI content document.

In August 2015, all the Kindle e-readers released within the previous two years were updated with a new typesetting and layout engine that adds hyphens, kerning and ligatures to the text; e-books that support this engine require the use of the "Kindle Format 10" (KFX) file format. E-books that support the enhanced typesetting format are indicated in the e-book's description on its product page.

In 2017, Amazon released Kindle Create, a tool that can convert Microsoft Word files to Kindle file format.

In 2022, while the Send-to-Kindle service only supported the original .mobi/.azw ebook formats (along with some other non-ebook file formats), Amazon announced removing this support in favor of .epub which will be converted to Amazon's KF8 (.azw3) from late-2022.
