= SmartQ 5 =

- Manufacturer: Smart Devices
- Type: Mobile Internet Device / Portable Media Player
- CPU: Samsung 1176 Mobile Application Processor based on a S3C6410 ARM11 at 667 MHz/800Mhz
- Memory: 128MB DDR 133 MHz SDRAM (can be overclocked to 333 MHz)
- Storage: SDHC card slot (up to 32 GB)
- Graphics: SoC graphics unit, OpenGL ES 1.1/2.0, 4M triangles/sec @133Mhz (Transform only)
- Connectivity: Wi-Fi, USB On-The-Go. USB Mini-B plug, Bluetooth
- Dimensions: 120x74x14mm
- Weight: 160g
- Website: www.smartdevices.com.cn

The SmartQ 5 is a budget mobile Internet device manufactured by the Chinese company Smart Devices. It was officially announced 11 February 2009.

== Overview ==
The SmartQ 5 comes with a custom version of Ubuntu Linux installed which is adapted for use with a touchscreen. It uses the LXDE desktop environment.

Ubuntu's main pre-installed applications are:

- Midori web browser
- FBReader e-book reader
- Claws email client
- SMPlayer multimedia player
- Abiword word processor
- Gnumeric spreadsheet
- Transmission torrent client
- Sonata music player
- Pidgin instant messenger
- Evince PDF/document reader
- rgbPaint painting program
- GDebi package installer
- PCMan File Manager

It is possible to install another Linux besides the default OS. Several Linux distributions like Mer and a ported Android support the SmartQ 5.

Smart Devices has obtained a Windows CE 6.0 royalty, the OS has been made available on the official site. Although a license from Microsoft needs to be purchased to activate Windows CE.

== Specifications ==
- Samsung Mobile Application Processor S3C6410 based on ARM11 core at 667 MHz/800 MHz
- 128 MB DDR 133/333 MHz SDRAM
- 1 GB NAND FLASH (256 MB usable for storage)
- AC97 audio codec & PCM 24-bit audio
- SoC graphics unit, OpenGL ES 1.1/2.0, 4M triangles/sec @133Mhz (Transform only)
- Integrated Wi-Fi 802.11b/g
- Integrated Bluetooth 2.0 + EDR
- 800x480 resolution resistive touchscreen LCD, 4.3", 16.7 million colors
- SDHC card slot (up to 32 GB)
- Headphone output power up to earphone 40 mW, frequency Response 20 Hz-20.000 Hz SNR 94dB
- Internal microphone
- USB 2.0 OTG port (480 Mbit/s)
- Runs Ubuntu Linux
- 2000mAH rechargeable lithium polymer battery
- Dimensions: 120x74x14mm
- Weight: 160 g

== See also ==
- SmartQ 7
- SmartQ V5
- SmartQ V7
- SmartQ R7
