= Intel Reader =

The Intel Reader is a portable, handheld assistive technology device that allows users to take a photo of printed material and have it read back to them aloud.

It was released in November 2009, supports English language images, and was sold in the U.S., Canada, the U.K. and Ireland. It also supports Open eBook.

The Intel Reader was discontinued in July 2013.
