= SoftBook =

First commercial handheld e-readers

SoftBook was one of the first commercial handheld e-readers produced for reading e-books that released in 1998 by SoftBook Press, Inc. of Menlo Park, California, US.

== Overview ==
The SoftBook, designed by IDEO and Lunar Design, featured a brown leather cover which flipped back to give the device a more book-like feel, and was notable for its large 6 × 8 inch (15.2 × 20.3 cm) touchscreen display which allowed you to navigate the HTML-based pages as well as highlight and draw simple notes on the pages. It could store approximately 1,500 pages (expandable up to 100,000), and claimed that the rechargeable battery allowed up to 5 hours of reading time.

Use of the SoftBook did not require a desktop computer or an Internet service provider; it had an RJ11 telephone jack and internal 33.6 kbit/s modem to connect with the "SoftBookstore" to download books. Publishers included HarperCollins, McGraw-Hill, Simon & Schuster, Warner Books, and others, and subscriptions to periodicals such as Newsweek, Time, and The Wall Street Journal were available (which could be downloaded automatically overnight if users kept the device plugged into a phone jack). Users could upload their own documents via SoftBook's Internet website for downloading to their SoftBook.

The SoftBook was the first device to comply with the Open eBook specification, which was "based primarily on technology developed by SoftBook Press".

== Specifications ==
Technical specifications printed on the back of the product box:

- Weight: 2.9 lbs (1.3 kg)
- Display: 9.5 inch (24.1 cm) diagonal, greyscale, backlit, touch-sensitive LCD, built-in protective cover
- Capacity: 2 MB (1,500 pages), expandable to 64 MB with Flash miniature card (50–100,000 pages)
- Modem: Built-in 33.6 Kbps modem; download approximately 100 pages per minute
- Power: Rechargeable lithium-ion battery pack. Up to 5 hours reading time (less than two-hour recharge). AC power adapter. Optional recharge cradle.
- Reading tools: Sophisticated searching, bookmarking, hyperlinking, text markup, stylus for marking and highlighting.
- System requirements: Analog telephone connection. AC power outlet for battery recharge.
- Price: $599.95 USD (original MSRP), or $299.95 plus $19.95 per month for a 24-month "content package" contract (totalling $778.75)

SoftBook utilized the US 4597058 and US 4725977 patents.

== SoftBook Press, Inc. ==
SoftBook Press logo

SoftBook Press, Inc. was founded by James Sachs and Tom Pomeroy in 1996, and located at 1075 Curtis St., Menlo Park CA, 94025. Book conversion was managed by The Lowe-Martin Group of Ottawa ON.

In 2000, SoftBook Press was acquired by Gemstar-TV Guide International, who also acquired its competitor, NuvoMedia (creator of the Rocket eBook), and merged them into the Gemstar eBook Group.
