= Digital Reader 1000 =

iRex Digital Reader 1000
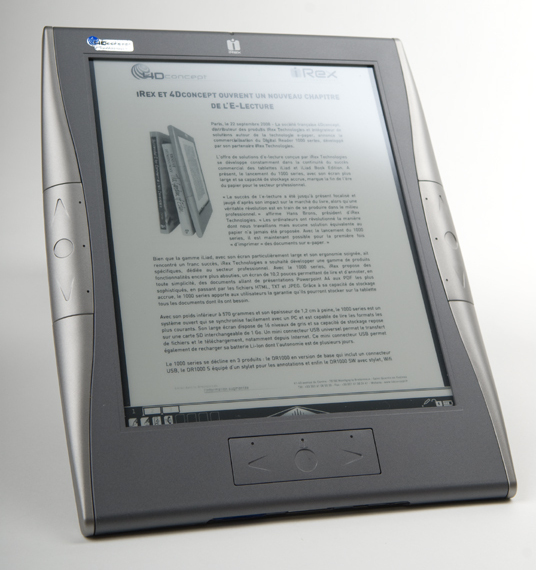
- The iRex DR1000
- Manufacturer: iRex Technologies
- Type: E-book reader
- Released: 22 September 2008
- Operating system: Linux-2.6
- CPU: Freescale i.MX31L processor
- Storage: 128 MB internal RAM, accepts SD cards up to 32 GB
- Display: 10.2 in diagonal, 1024 × 1280 pixels or 1.25 megapixels, 160 ppi density, 16-level grayscale electronic paper
- Dimensions: 8.5 × 10.5 × 0.5 in (217 x 268 x 11.9 mm)
- Weight: 18.8 oz (530 g)

The Digital Reader 1000 (DR1000) was an e-Book reading device produced by iRex in the Netherlands. Production ceased in 2010, when iRex filed for bankruptcy. The DR1000 was produced with a 10.2-inch (25.9 cm) e-ink display.

== Versions ==
Three different versions were planned:

- DR1000 (without touchscreen)
- DR1000S (with touchscreen)
- DR1000SW (with touchscreen and Wi-Fi & Bluetooth connectivity)

The DR1000 has an internal memory of 128MB, and ships with a 1GB SD card. The manufacturer indicated that this can store up to 1,000 documents or pictures. The S and SW models have touchscreens compatible with Wacom styluses.

== Compatible formats ==
The iRex DR1000 can display various text formats including PDF, TXT, HTML and Mobi. In addition, it can display images in BMP, GIF, JPEG, PNG and TIFF formats.

== Criticism ==
The DR1000 was originally marketed as able to "last days" on a single battery charge, while users reported battery life of 12 hours at most. The "days" statement was removed from the IRex product page around the time that version 1.5 of the device firmware was released.
