= COOL-ER =

E-book reader

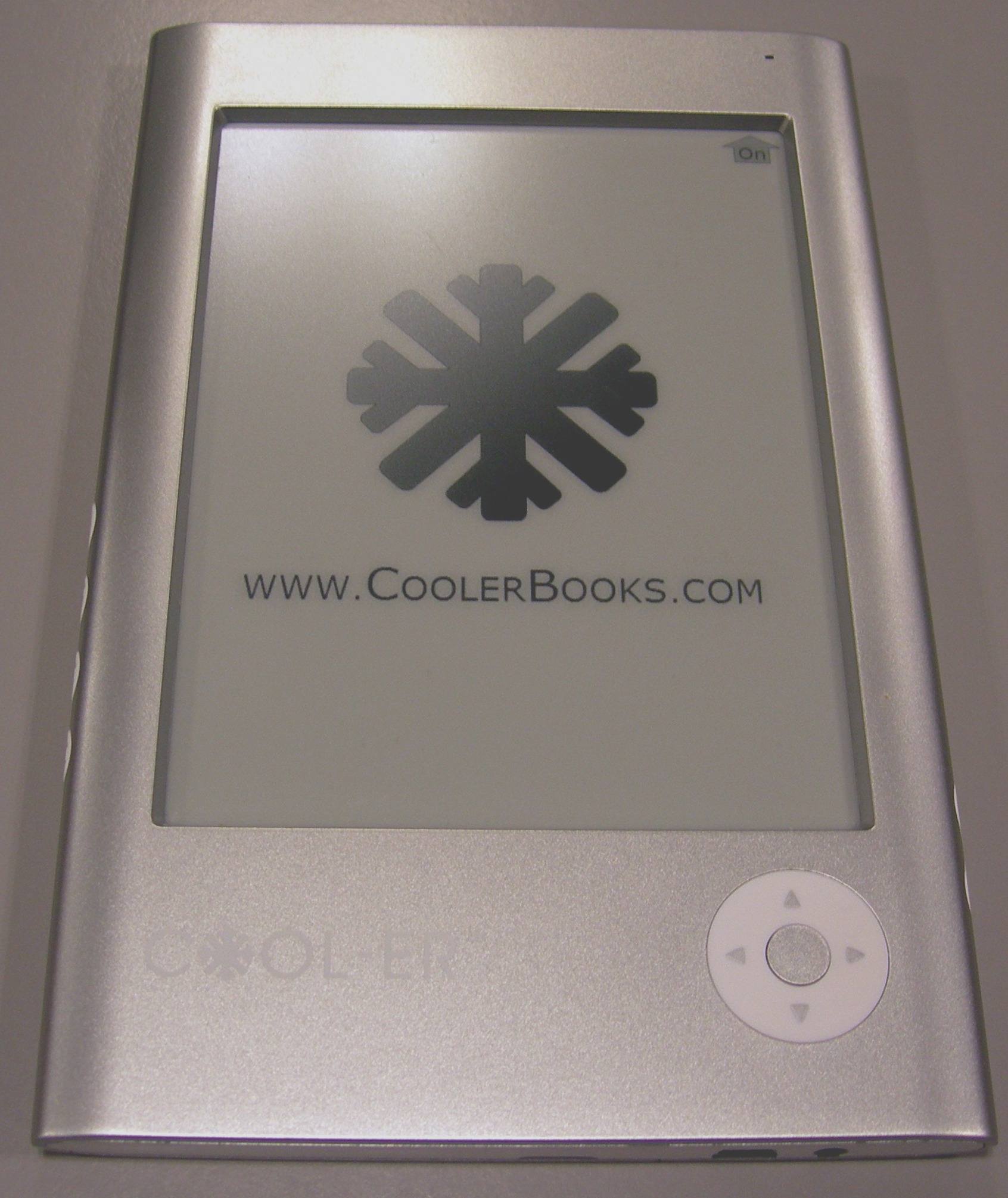
A "silver shine" COOL-ER, front.

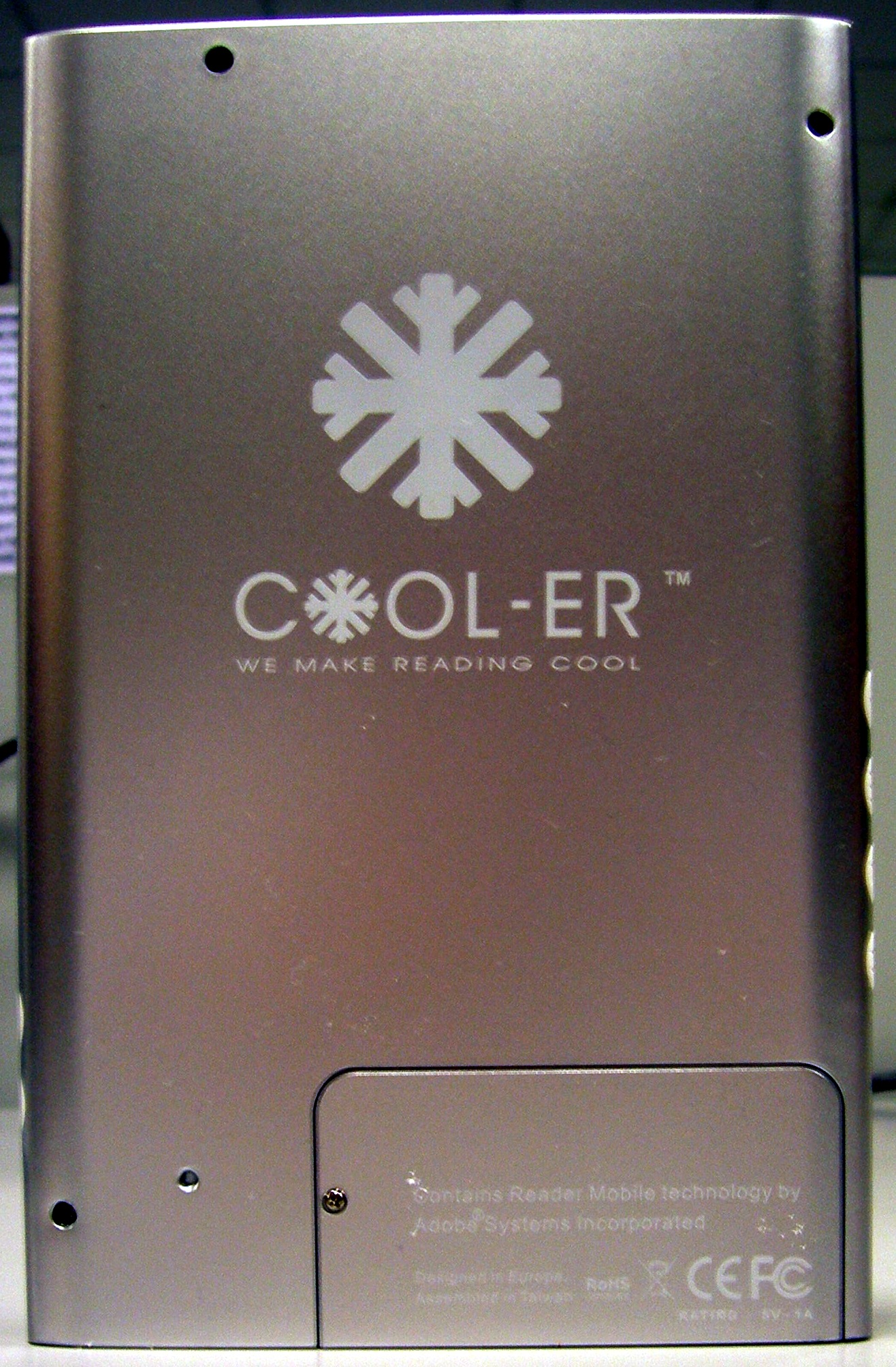
Reverse side

The COOL-ER is a discontinued e-book reader from UK company Interead. The device is compatible with both Mac and Windows computers, comes in a variety of colors, and supports e-books in English, Spanish, Portuguese, German, French, Dutch, Russian, Korean, Ukrainian, Mandarin and Japanese. The device is commonly compared with the Amazon Kindle. Reviewers cite the lower price, MP3 support, and lighter weight as advantages; but complain of the COOL-ER's lack of wireless connectivity and button insensitivity. On 8 June 2010, Interead went into liquidation after failing to secure funding.

== Specifications ==
=== Dimensions ===
- Height (mm): 183
- Width (mm): 117.74
- Depth (mm): 10.89
- Volume (litres): 0.23
- Weight (g): 178

=== Screen ===
- Size: 6"
- DPI: 170 pixels per inch
- Levels of Greyscale: 8
- Type: E Ink Vizplex
- Manufacturer: PVI (E Ink)

=== Hardware ===
- Storage: 1 GB
- Memory: 128 MB
- Processor: Samsung S3C2440 ARM 400 MHz
- Battery: Li-Polymer battery (1000 mAh)
- Battery Life: 8000 page turns
- Memory Expansion: SD (up to 4GB)
- Wireless: No

=== Compatibility ===
- PC: Yes
- Mac: Yes
- Supported formats: PDF, EPUB, FB2, RTF, TXT, HTML, PRC, JPG, MP3
