= Plucker =

Ebook reader software and file format

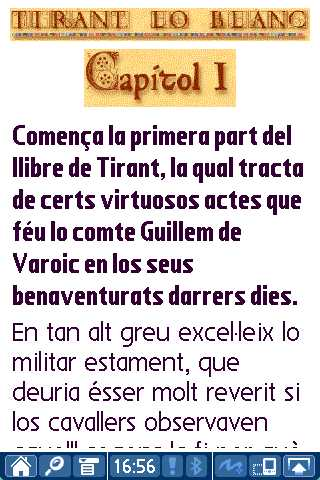
- Plucker version of Tirant lo Blanc.
- Original author: Mark Lillywhite
- Developer: Plucker Developers
- Release: 1998
- Stable release: 1.8 Palm Application; 1.6.2.0 Desktop Installer Package; 0.6.3 Windows Mobile devices / 2004
- Written in: Python
- Operating system: Palm OS, Linux, Windows, Windows Mobile
- License: GNU General Public License
- Website: Last archive of official website (2015-07-09)

Plucker is an open-source offline e-reader for PDAs, and the associated Plucker file format. The Plucker software suite includes a supporting desktop application for creating Plucker files and transferring them to supported devices.

Plucker was designed for late-1990s and early-2000s low-power handheld devices such as the Palm Pilot, before the advent of widespread wireless internet and internet-enabled mobile devices. Plucker uses an extensible plugin design to convert content from file formats and web-based formats into a compact Plucker file with formatted text and embedded images, for offline mobile reading. Okular supports the Plucker file format.

== See also ==
- Wikipedia:Snapshots – 2000 Wikipedia articles in Plucker format
- FBReader – free FictionBook ebook reader which can view Plucker and HTML files.
- iSiloX
- Evernote
- Calibre

== Sources ==
- Steward, Sid (2004). "Create a Handheld Edition from Your HTML". PDF Hacks: 100 Industrial-Strength Tips & Tools. O'Reilly Media. pp. 91–94. ISBN 9781449362201.
- "MobileRead Wiki - Plucker". wiki.mobileread.com.
