= ILiad =

E-Reader

iRex iLiad
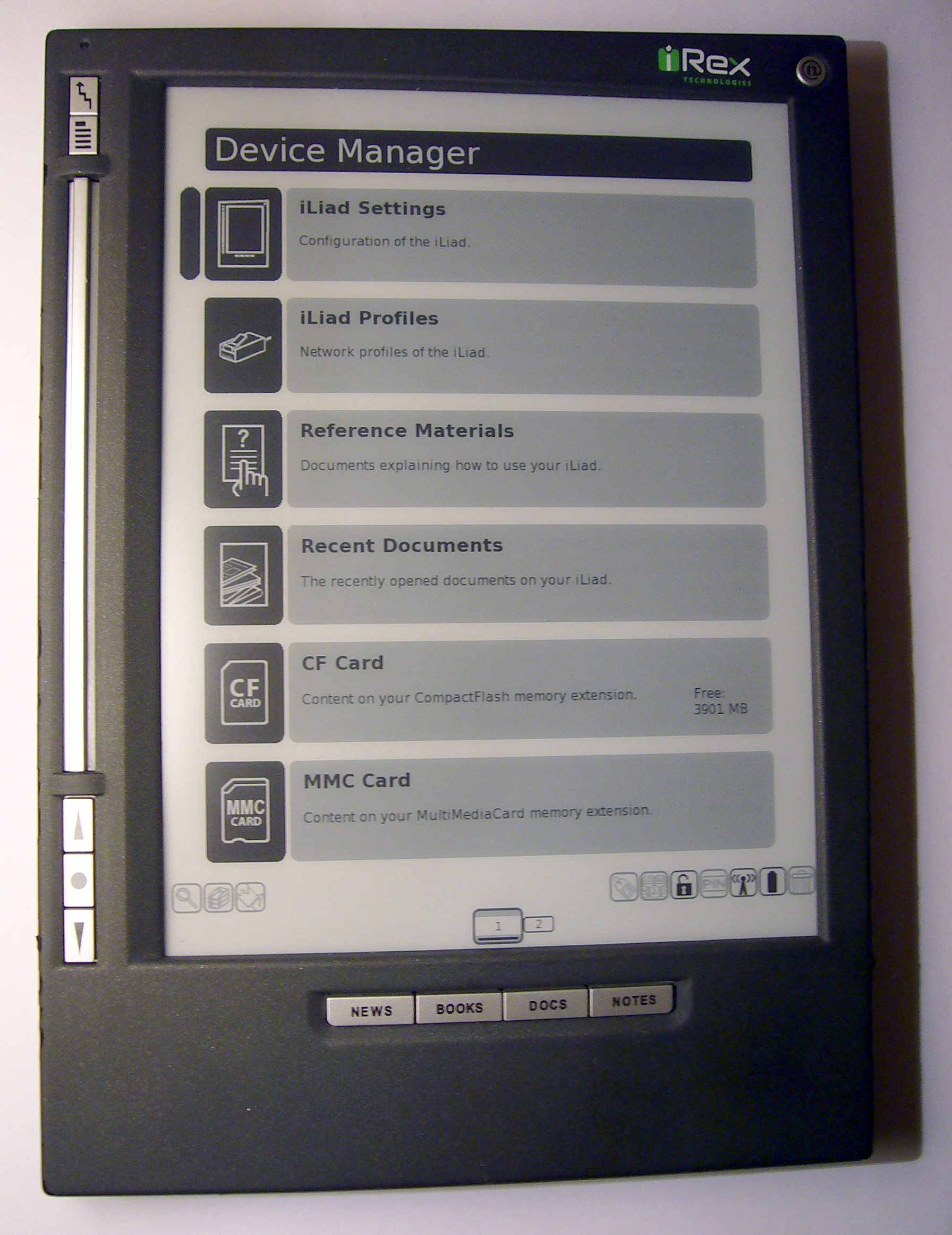
- Manufacturer: iRex Technologies
- Compatible networks: MyiRex account
- Dimensions: 155×217×16 mm (6.10×8.54×0.63 in) (W * HxD)
- Weight: 389 g (13.7 oz)
- Operating system: Linux, 2.4 kernel
- CPU: 400 MHz Intel XScale
- Memory: 64 MB RAM
- Storage: 256 MB internal, 128 MB available Expandable by USB, MMC, CF cards
- Battery: Lithium ion battery
- Display: 124×152 mm (W×H), 768×1024 pixels, 160 ppi density, 16-level grayscale Electronic paper
- Connectivity: WiFi 802.11g, 10/100 Mbit/s Ethernet LAN (via travel hub), USB port, audio jack
- Data inputs: WACOM touchscreen, Graphical user interface, next/prev/quick access buttons

The iLiad was an electronic handheld device, or e-Reader, which could be used for document reading and editing. Like the Barnes and Noble Nook, Sony Reader or Amazon Kindle, the iLiad made use of an electronic paper display. In 2010, sales of the iLiad ended when its parent company, iRex Technologies, filed for bankruptcy.

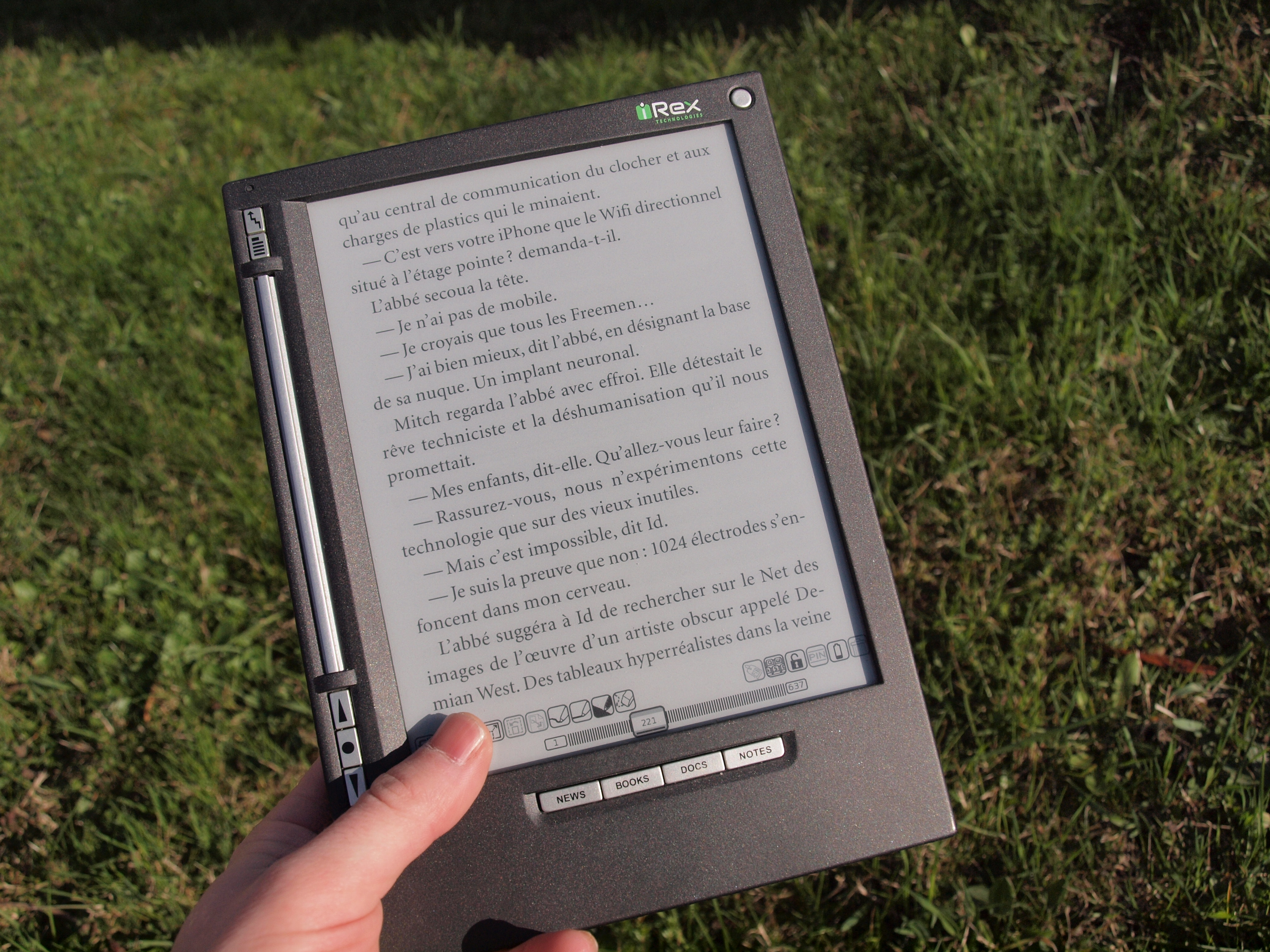
iLiad in sunlight

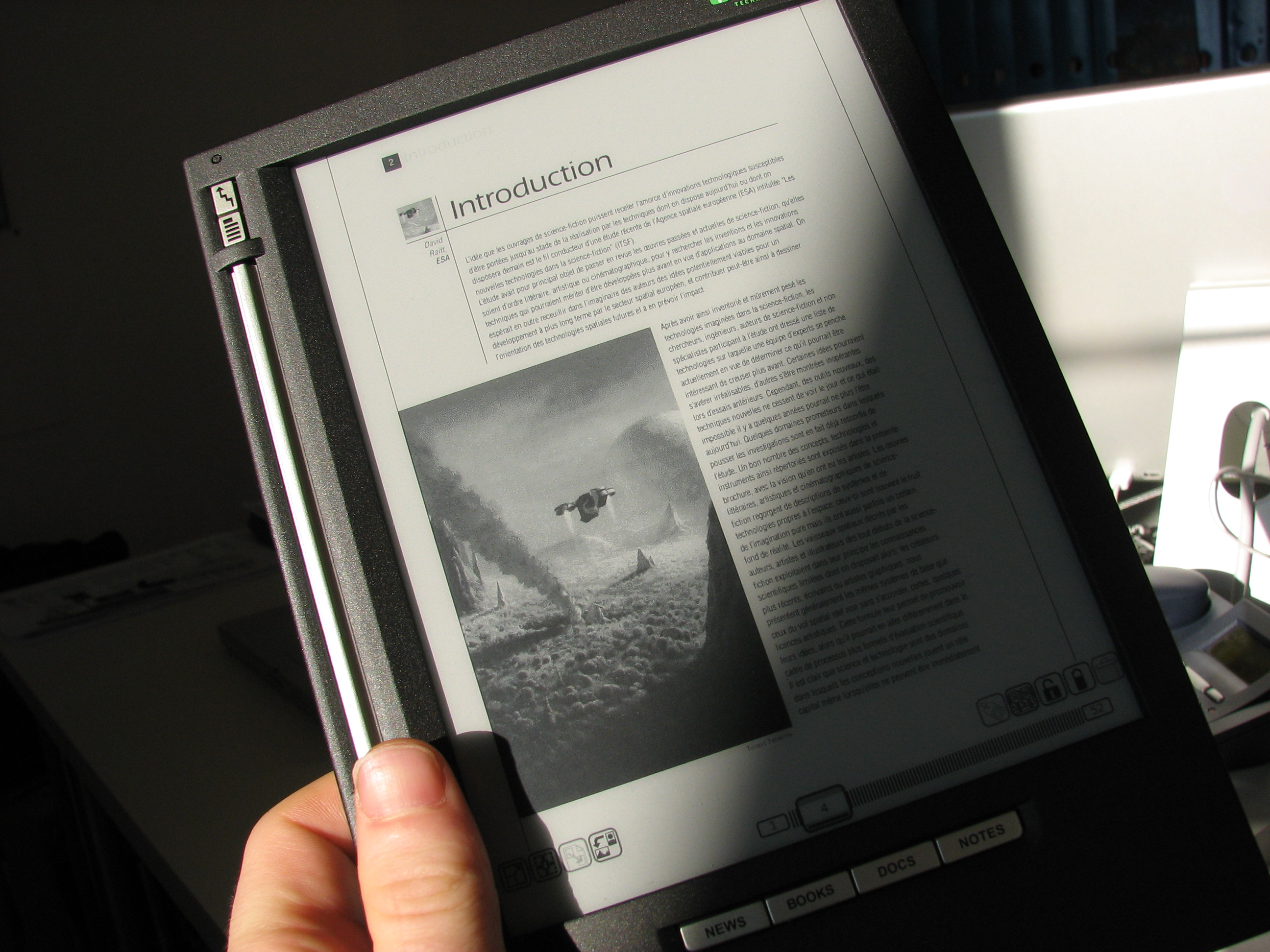
iLiad e-book reader equipped with e-paper display

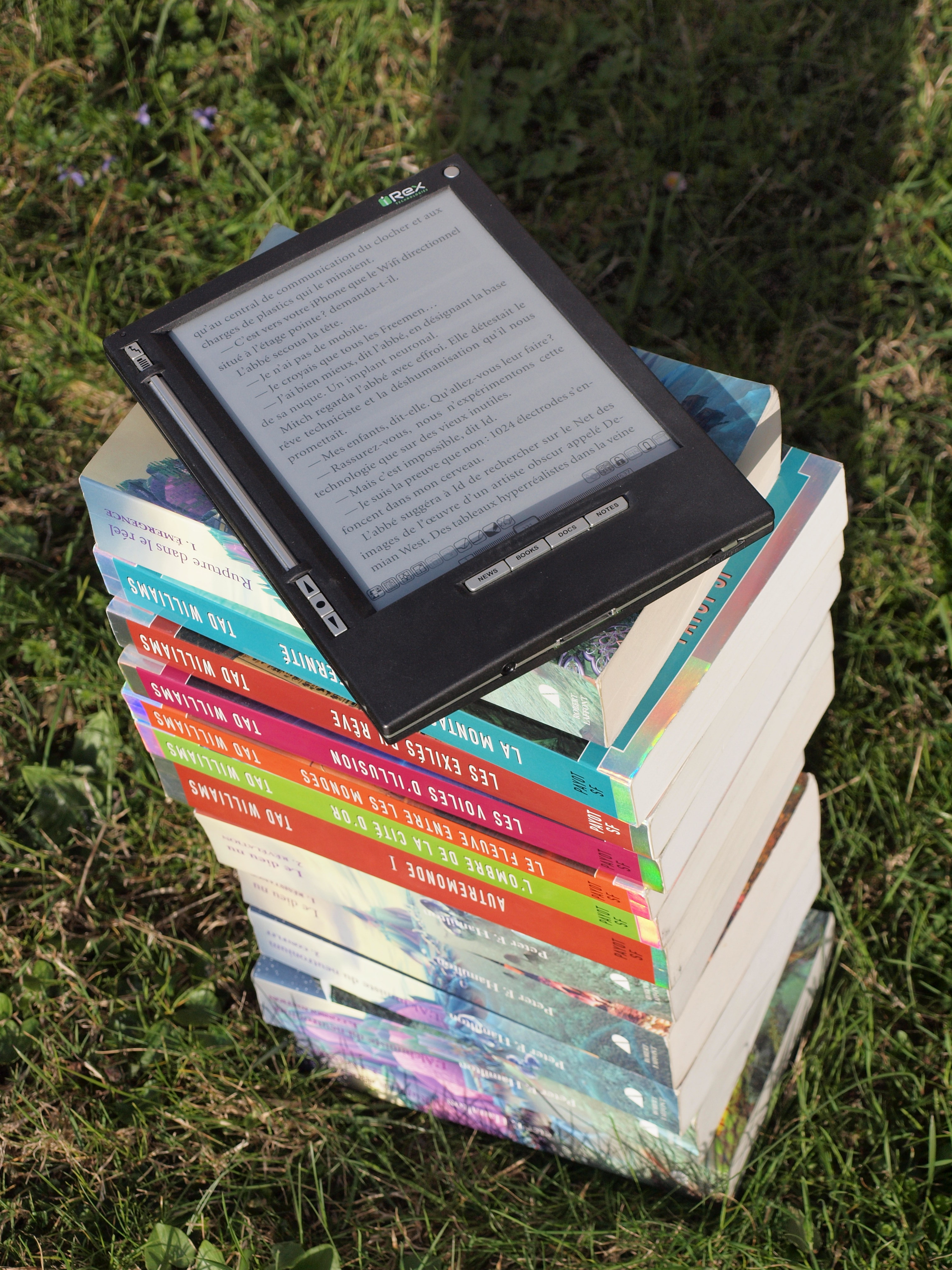

== Description ==
Main specifications:

- 8.1-inch (21 cm) electronic paper display, area for displaying content is 124 mm × 165 mm
- resolution of 768×1024 pixels, 160 dpi
- 16 levels of grayscale
- USB connector for external storage
- CompactFlash Type II slot for memory extension or other applications
- MultiMediaCard slot for MMC memory cards
- 3.5 mm stereo audio jack for a headset
- WiFi 802.11g wireless LAN
- 10/100 Mbit/s wired LAN
- 390 grams (14 oz) weight
- 400 MHz Intel XScale processor
- 64 MB RAM
- 256 MB internal flash memory, 128 for user, 128 for system
- Linux-based operating system, 2.4 kernel
- SDK provided, so functionality is easily extended

It measures 155 mm × 216 mm × 16 mm (width × height × depth), the size of an A5 document, or roughly a 6"×9" steno notebook. The display used is an active matrix electrophoretic display, which uses E Ink Vizplex Imaging Film manufactured by E Ink Corporation. Underneath the E Ink screen is a digitizing tablet by WACOM which requires a stylus for input. When it was introduced, the Iliad had largest screen size of existing e-paper products, but the newer iRex Digital Reader 1000's 10.2-inch (26 cm) display is the largest sold as of early 2011.

The iLiad can display document files in several formats, including PDF, Mobipocket, XHTML and plain text. It can also display JPEG, BMP and PNG images, but not in color. As of May 3, 2007 Mobipocket is supported, making the mobipocket digital rights management (DRM) content available on this platform. iRex's product page for the iLiad states that "Support for additional E-book formats will become available over the coming months."

Through its wireless service, iDS, the iLiad can also directly download content. Les Echos, a French financial newspaper, is distributed this way, as is Dutch newspaper NRC Handelsblad. Users can connect to their computer over a wireless network to sync new data onto the iLiad's internal memory or an inserted MMC, SD, or CF card.

The distributor of the iLiad is iRex Technologies, a Philips spin-off company. It was initially advertised in December 2005, to be launched in April 2006, but was delayed until July, when it started to be sold as a beta product. It was released to the general public near the end of July, and since then has undergone considerable software revisions.

Its list price in Europe is €649, and in US $699, however it is no longer available in North America due to FCC regulation non-compliance.

== Advanced features ==
One of the advanced features of the iLiad is the ability to add notes to existing documents. With the integrated Wacom tablet and stylus, it is possible to write directly on almost any document and those notes will remain on that document whenever it is viewed on the iLiad. Using the desktop software, those notes can be merged into the original document. This provides malleability, an important feature of physical books that is missing from most ebook products, allowing users to annotate, highlight, and personalize the text.

== Third-party development ==
Because of its open Linux operating system, the iLiad was able to run third party applications created for it. Developers and users wishing to create or run third party applications had the ability to request shell access from the manufacturer.

Developers were able to improve on the device's functionality by porting viewers such as FBReader, and programs such as AbiWord and StarDict. Full screen PDF reading was made available by community-supported iPDF releases. Some independent users reported successful porting of mobile web browsers to iLiad's Linux platform, although with limited functionality and many bugs.

== Version 2 ==
In September 2007, iRex Technologies released an update to the iLiad. While officially called "iLiad 2nd Edition", it is generally noted as a minor update to the original.

The update includes:

- Redesigned backplane
- Increased battery capacity
- Software version 2.11
- Updated travel charger
- Included case

The 2.11 software, which contains stylus calibration, extended battery life, and other things, is also available to first-generation iLiads.

== Book edition ==
In May 2008, iRex Technologies added a third installment to the iLiad line of products, this time branded under the name iLiad Book Edition. This is the iLiad Version 2 without WiFi and a new silver look. The technical cutbacks reduce the price to $599 (€499), which is cheaper than the original. It also comes with 50 free classics, including works from well-known writers Jules Verne, Charles Dickens, Lewis Carroll, and Leo Tolstoy.

== Bankruptcy ==
In early June 2010, iRex Technologies of the Netherlands filed for bankruptcy protection. According to CEO Hans Brons (2010), the decline in sales were a direct result of a delayed response from the U.S. Federal Communications Commission (FCC) to approve the device.

== See also ==
- Comparison of e-readers
