= Aldiko =

E-book reader application

Aldiko Next
- Developer: De Marque
- Stable release: 4.8.1 (Android); 1.9.1 (iOS) / January 24, 2023 (Android) July 13, 2023 (iOS)
- Operating system: Android, iOS
- Type: e-book reader
- License: Proprietary
- Website: www.aldiko.com

Aldiko is an e-book reader application for the Android and iOS operating systems.

== Description ==
It supports the EPUB format for digital publications and incorporates facilities for browsing online catalogs on thousands of books (including thousands of free public domain work) and downloading them directly into the user's personal library. The application features a bookshelf-like user interface that lets user navigate their collection of eBooks. It also provides a customizable reading experience through configurable font and background color, font size and type, margin size, display brightness, page turn mode, etc. Additionally, the application allows users to import their own books to read them on the go. Aldiko does not support font embedding.

== Features ==
At debut

1. In-app browsing and downloading capability
2. Read detailed descriptions before purchase & download
3. Adjust front, background, link, layout & text alignment
4. Day/Night themes: switch between day/night mode when reading in high/low-luminosity areas
5. Brightness Control
6. Customizable navigation modes
7. Full support for Table of Contents
8. Quickly resume reading: the app automatically opens a book where users last left off
9. Bookmarks: allows users to create their own bookmarks anywhere in a book to remember sections of interest
10. Progress: allows users to check their reading progress in a chapter and in a book
11. Share: allows users to recommend books to others via email, Facebook, Twitter, SMS
12. The reading engine automatically adjusts to the size of the device’s display
13. Library management: books can be organized by Tags or Collections
14. Edit detailed book information (title, author, tag, collection, rating)
15. Sort books by title, author, download late, last read date or rating

Added after debut

1. Import: allows users to import their own books to read them on the go
2. Option to turn pages with volume keys
3. Option to change the cover art of a book
4. Open images within a book in a separate viewer
5. Open links within a book on browser
6. Backward/forward functions: allows users to go back to where they were before clicking a link to a different section of the book
7. Full text search: allows users to search any word globally within a book
8. Dictionary lookup: allows users to look up any word definition in dictionary, Wikipedia or on Google
9. Option to lock display orientation
10. Option to set text alignment to left, justify or right
11. Go To: allows users to quickly access any position within a book
12. Option to Enable/Disable CSS Style Sheet
13. Support for Adobe DRM

== Online catalog ==
Aldiko Limited, the app's company, has partnered with a number of content partners to offer in-app purchasing and downloading capability, including Feedbooks, Smashwords, All Romance Ebooks and O'Reilly Media. The company also said that they are working to establish partnerships with more content providers.

== Standalone book applications ==
On September 23, 2009, the company announced on their blog that multiple standalone book applications had been built on top of Aldiko Book Reader. The standalone book apps were based on titles from O’Reilly.
