= PocketBook International =

E-book reader company

PocketBook International S.A.
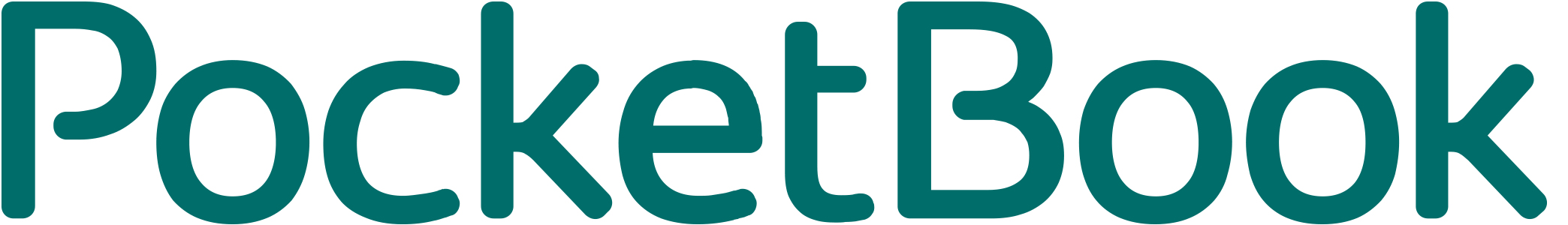
- Type: Privately held company
- Industry: Consumer electronics Online distribution
- Founded: 2007
- Headquarters: Lugano, Switzerland
- Products: E-book readers
- Revenue: ▲$ 151 million (2010)
- Number of employees: 230 (June 2020)
- Website: pocketbook.ch/en-ch

PocketBook is a multinational company that produces e-book readers based on E Ink technology (an electronic paper technology) under the PocketBook brand. The company was founded in 2007 in Kyiv, Ukraine, and moved its headquarters to Lugano, Switzerland in 2012. These devices enable users to browse, buy, download, and read e-books, newspapers, magazines, and other digital media via wireless networking to the PocketBook Store.

== History ==
PocketBook International was founded in 2007 by Oleg Naumenko. The company was founded in Kyiv, Ukraine. In 2012, the company moved its headquarters to Lugano, Switzerland.

The company developed the first PocketBook e-reader, PocketBook 301, in 2008 and released its second e-reader, the PocketBook 360 °, in 2009. A year later, PocketBook IQ 701, a multimedia e-book reader running the Android operating system, was released, along with the market launch of the PocketBook Pro 602 and PocketBook Pro 902. Bookland.net was also launched in 2010.

PocketBook Pro 603 and 903 launched in 2011, and were the world's first e-book readers with a smartphone set of wireless interfaces (Bluetooth, Wi-Fi and 3G).

The PocketBook 360 Plus, an updated version of the Pocketbook 360 model with Wi-Fi support and more powerful architecture, was released in 2011, along with the PocketBook A10, a tablet computer running Android 2.3.5.

In 2013, the company presented PocketBook Colour Lux, the world's first color E Ink e-reader with built-in light. That same year, PocketBook launched PocketBook Mini, a 5-inch compact E Ink e-reader, and introduced the PocketBook CoverReader – the first flip-cover with E Ink screen for smartphones. In addition, a new construction-oriented device PocketBook CAD Reader with EPD E Ink Fina screens first shown at Autodesk University international exhibition in Los Angeles, USA. The CAD Reader has remained vaporware ever since.

In March 2014 world's first serial water-resistant and dustproof E Ink reader PocketBook Aqua was announced. Later, in May 2014 PocketBook represents the first serial E Ink e-reader with a built-in camera, PocketBook Ultra. 7.8-inch PocketBook InkPad was also released in spring 2014.

At IFA 2015 in Berlin PocketBook shows recently announced PocketBook Touch Lux 3, a new flagship model. That same year, it also released PocketBook Digital, an end-to-end e-reading solution intended to provide growth opportunities to companies engaged in the book industry.

Among the new products represented by PocketBook in 2017, PocketBook Aqua 2, the successor of Aqua series, water-proof and dust-resistant e-reader with IP57, that can be immersed into the water for 30 minutes on 1 meter depth.

In February 2018 the PocketBook InkPad 3 with 7.8-inch screen and SMARTlight function was launched.

PocketBook has released 10.3-inch e-reader InkPad X in 2019. That same year, the brand’s flagship model Touch HD 3 with SMARTlight function was launched.

PocketBook launched its own on-line bookshop for customers in D-A-Ch region – pocketbook.de in 2020, and a new bookshop also appeared on PocketBook e-readers as the preinstalled application. In spring 2020 PocketBook Color was first presented to the market, it became the first e-reader with color E Ink Kaleido screen.

In 2021, PocketBook extended the product line of color e-readers announcing the 7.8-inch e-reader with color E Ink new Kaleido (Kaleido Plus) screen. A year later, PocketBook Era with new generation E Ink Carta™ 1200 screen (300 DPI) and audiobook support was released. The PocketBook Viva was also announced, the first E Ink Gallery 3 color device.

In 2023, the company announced the release of the InkPad Color 3 with E Ink Kaleido 3. A year later, PocketBook announced the InkPad Eo with a 10.3 inch E Ink Kaleido 3 screen, the Verse Pro Color, and the Color Note.

== Device list ==
Legend:	Archived	Current

The devices are assembled by factories such as Foxconn, Wisky and Yitoa and shipped out to more than 40 countries.

The company's products are sold in 35 countries worldwide – in Central, Eastern, and Western Europe, in Baltic and Commonwealth of Independent States countries, as well as in Australia, Israel, New Zealand, and others.

Model	Display Type	Display Size	Display Resolution	Display Density	Storage	CPU (Chipset)	Connectivity	Features	Dimensions	Weight	Released	Battery	RAM
Verta Color	E-Ink Kaleido 3	6″	536 × 724 (4096 colors) 1072 × 1448 (greyscale)	150 ppi (color) 300 ppi (greyscale)	16 GB	Rockchip RK3566 Quad-core 1.8 GHz	USB-C, Wi-Fi (2.4/5GHz), Bluetooth 5.0	SMARTlight, Waterproof (IPX4), Audio, Audiobooks, Text-to-speech	154 × 111 × 7 mm	140 g	2026	1500 mAh	1 GB
Verta	E-Ink Carta 1300	6″	1,448 x 1,072	300 ppi	16 GB	Rockchip RK3566 Quad-core 1.8 GHz	USB-C, Wi-Fi (2.4/5GHz), Bluetooth 5.0	SMARTlight, Waterproof (IPX4), Audio, Audiobooks, Text-to-speech	154 × 111 × 7 mm	140 g	2026	1500 mAh	1 GB
Q	E-Ink Carta 1300	5.84″	788 x 1576	300 ppi	32 GB	Rockchip RK3566 Quad-core 1.8 GHz	USB-C, Wi-Fi (2.4/5GHz), Bluetooth 5.0	SMARTlight, Waterproof (IPX4), Audio, Audiobooks, Text-to-speech	154 × 75,8 × 6,5 mm	130 g	2026	1550 mAh	1 GB
Era Lite	E-Ink Carta 1300	7″	1264×1680	300 ppi	16 GB	Allwinner B288 Dual core 1 GHz	USB-C, Wi-Fi (2.4/5GHz), Bluetooth 5.1	SMARTlight, Waterproof (IPX4), Audio, Audiobooks, Text-to-speech	134,3mm × 155mm × 7,8mm	204 g	2026	1700 mAh	1 GB
Color Note	E-Ink Kaleido 3	10.3"	468 × 624 (4096 colors) 1404 × 1872 (greyscale)	76 ppi (color) 227 ppi (greyscale)	32 GB	Allwinner B810 Quad core 1.5 Ghz	USB-C, Wi-Fi (2.4/5GHz), Bluetooth 5.2	SMARTlight, Audio, Audiobooks, Text-to-speech, Android 12	173,5 × 246 × 6,4 mm	390 g	2024	4000 mAh	4 GB
Verse Pro Color	E-Ink Kaleido 3	6″	536 × 724 (4096 colors) 1072 × 1448 (greyscale)	150 ppi (color) 300 ppi (greyscale)	16 GB	Allwinner B300 Quad core 1.8 GHz	USB-C, Wi-Fi (2.4/5 GHz), Bluetooth 5.4	SMARTlight, Waterproof (IPX8), Audio, Audiobooks, Text-to-speech	108 × 156 × 7.6 mm	182 g	2024	2100 mAh	1 GB
InkPad Eo	E-Ink Kaleido 3	10.3″	930 x 1240 (4096 colors) 1860 x 2480 (greyscale)	150 ppi (color) 300 ppi (greyscale)	64 GB	Mediatek Helio P35 Octo core 2.3 GHz	USB-C, Wi-Fi (b/g/n 2.4/5 GHz), Bluetooth 5.0	SMARTlight, Audio, Audiobooks, Text-to-speech, Android 11	226 х 191 х 7 mm	470 g	2024	4000 mAh	4 GB
Era Color	E-Ink Kaleido 3	7″	632 x 840 (4096 colors) / 1264 x 1680 (greyscale)	150 ppi (color), 300 ppi (grey)	32 GB	Allwinner B300 Quad core 1.8 GHz	USB-C, Wi-Fi (b/g/n 2.4/5 GHz), Bluetooth 5.4	Adaptive SMARTlight, Waterproof (IPX8), Audio, Audiobooks, Text-to-speech	134.3 x 155 x 7.8 mm	235 g	2024	2500 mAh	1 GB
Verse	E-Ink Carta	6″	758 x 1024	212 ppi	8 GB	Allwinner B288 Dual core 1 GHz	USB-C, Wi-Fi (2.4 GHz), microSD/SDHC (max 128 GB)	SMARTlight	108 x 156 x 7.6 mm	186 g	2023	1500 mAh	512 MB
Verse Pro	E-Ink Carta 1200	6″	1072 x 1448	300 ppi	16 GB	Allwinner B288 Dual core 1 GHz	USB-C, Wi-Fi (2.4 GHz), Bluetooth	SMARTlight, Waterproof (IPX8), Audio, Audiobooks, Text-to-speech	108 x 156 x 7.6 mm	186 g	2023	1500 mAh	512 MB
InkPad Color 3	E-Ink Kaleido 3	7.8″	702 x 936 (4096 colors) / 1404 x 1872 (16 grey levels)	150 ppi (color), 300 ppi (grey)	32 GB	Allwinner B300 Quad core 1.8 GHz	USB-C, Wi-Fi (2.4 GHz, 5 GHz), Bluetooth	SMARTlight, Waterproof (IPX8), Audio, Audiobooks, Text-to-speech	134 x 189 x 7.9 mm	270 g	2023	2900 mAh	1 GB
InkPad Color 2	E-Ink Kaleido Plus	7.8″	468 x 624 (color) / 1404 x 1872 (grey)	100 ppi (color), 300 ppi (grey)	32 GB	Allwinner B300 Quad core 1.8 GHz	USB-C, Wi-Fi (b/g/n 2.4 GHz, 5 GHz), Bluetooth 5.0	SMARTlight, Waterproof (IPX8), Audio, Audiobooks, Text-to-speech	134 x 189.5 x 7.95 mm	267 g	2023	2900 mAh	1 GB
InkPad X Pro	E Ink Carta Mobius	10.3″	1404 x 1872	227 ppi	32 GB	Allwinner B300 Quad core 1.8 GHz	USB-C, Wi-Fi (b/g/n 2.4 GHz), Bluetooth 4.0 (A2DP, AVRCP)	WACOM, SMARTlight, Audiobooks, Text-to-speech	249 x 173 x 7.7 mm	350 g	2023	3200 mAh	2 GB
InkPad 4	E-Ink Carta 1200	7.8″	1404 x 1872	300 ppi	32 GB	Allwinner B288 Dual core 1 GHz	USB-C, Wi-Fi (b/g/n 2.4 GHz), Bluetooth 4.0	SMARTlight, Waterproof (IPX8), Audio, Audiobooks, Text-to-speech	134 x 189.5 x 7.95 mm	265 g	2023	2000 mAh	1 GB
Era (700)	E-Ink Carta 1200	7″	1264 x 1680	300 ppi	16 GB / 64 GB	Allwinner B288 dual core 1 GHz	USB-C, Wi-Fi (b/g/n 2.4 GHz), Bluetooth 4.0	SMARTlight, Waterproof (IPX8), Audio, Audiobooks, Text-to-speech	134.3 x 155 x 7.8 mm	228 g	2022	1700 mAh	1 GB
InkPad Lite	E-Ink Carta	9.7″	825 x 1200	150 ppi	8 GB	Allwinner B288 Dual core 1 GHz	USB-C, Wi-Fi (b/g/n 2.4 GHz), microSD/SDHC (max 128 GB)	SMARTlight	236.2 x 173 x 7.9 mm	369 g	2021	2200 mAh	512 MB
InkPad Color	E-Ink Kaleido Plus	7.8″	468 x 624 (color), 1404 x 1872 (grey)	100 ppi (color), 300 ppi (grey)	16 GB	Allwinner B288 dual core 1 GHz	USB-C, Wi-Fi (b/g/n 2.4 GHz), microSD/SDHC (max 128 GB), Bluetooth	Frontlight, Audio, Audiobooks, Text-to-speech	195 x 136.5 x 8 mm	225 g	2021	2900 mAh	1 GB
Basic 4	E-Ink Carta	6″	1024 x 758	212 ppi	8 GB	1 GHz	Micro USB, microSD (max 32 GB)		161.3 x 108 x 8 mm	155 g	2020	800 mAh	256 MB
Touch Lux 5	E Ink Carta	6″	758 x 1024	212 ppi	8 GB	Allwinner B288 dual core 1 GHz	Micro USB, Wi-Fi (b/g/n), microSD/SDHC (max 32 GB)	SMARTlight	161.3 x 108 x 8 mm	155 g	2020	1500 mAh	512 MB
Color (633)	E Ink Kaleido	6″	1072 x 1448	212 ppi	16 GB	Allwinner B288 dual core 1 GHz	Micro USB, Wi-Fi (b/g/n 2.4 GHz), microSD/SDHC (max 128 GB), Bluetooth 4	Frontlight, Audio, Audiobooks, Text-to-speech	161.3 x 108 x 8 mm	160 g	2020	1900 mAh	1 GB
InkPad X	E Ink Carta Mobius	10.3″	1404 x 1872	227 ppi	32 GB	Allwinner B288 dual core 1 GHz	USB-C, Wi-Fi (b/g/n 2.4 GHz), Bluetooth 4.0 (A2DP, AVRCP)	SMARTlight, Audiobooks, Text-to-speech	249.2 x 173.4 x 7.7-4.5 mm	310 g	2019	2000 mAh	1 GB
Touch HD 3 (632)	E Ink Carta	6″	1072 x 1448	300 ppi	16 GB	Allwinner B288 dual core 1 GHz	Micro USB, Wi-Fi (b/g/n 2.4 GHz), Bluetooth 4.0	SMARTlight, Audiobooks, Text-to-speech, Waterproof (IPX8)	161.3 x 108 x 8 mm	155 g	2019	1500 mAh	512 MB
InkPad 3 Pro (740-1)	E Ink Carta	7.8″	1404 x 1872	300 ppi	16 GB	Allwinner B288 dual core 1 GHz	Micro USB, Wi-Fi (b/g/n 2.4 GHz), Bluetooth 4	SMARTlight, Waterproof (IPX8), Audio, Audiobooks, Text-to-speech	195 x 136.5 x 8 mm	225 g	2019	1900 mAh	1 GB
Touch Lux 4 (627)	E Ink Carta	6″	758 x 1024	212 ppi	8 GB	1 GHz	Micro USB, Wi-Fi (b/g/n 2.4 GHz), microSD/SDHC (max 128 GB)	Frontlight	161.3 x 108 x 8 mm	155 g	2018	1500 mAh	512 MB
Basic Lux 2	E Ink Carta	6″	1024 x 758	212 ppi	8 GB	1 GHz	Micro USB, Wi-Fi (b/g/n), microSD/SDHC (max 32 GB)	Frontlight	161.3 x 108 x 8 mm	155 g	2018	1300 mAh	256 MB
InkPad 3	E Ink Carta	7.8″	1404 x 1872	300 ppi	8 GB	Dual core 1 GHz	Micro USB, Wi-Fi (b/g/n), microSD/SDHC (max 128 GB)	SMARTlight	195 x 136.5 x 8 mm	210 g	2018	1900 mAh	1 GB
Touch HD 2 (631)	E Ink Carta	6″	1072 x 1448	300 ppi	8 GB	Freescale i.MX 6SoloLite 1 GHz	Micro USB, Wi-Fi (b/g/n), microSD/SDHC (max 32 GB), 3.5 mm headphone	SMARTlight	113.5 x 175 x 9 mm	180 g	2018	1500 mAh	512 MB
Aqua 2	E Ink Carta	6″	1024 x 758	212 ppi	8 GB	1000MHz	Micro USB, Wi-Fi (b/g/n)	Frontlight, Waterproof (IP57), Audio, Text-to-speech	174.4 x 114.6 x 9 mm	180 g	2017	1500 mAh	256 MB
Basic 3	E Ink Carta	6″	800 x 600	166 ppi	8 GB	1 GHz	Micro USB, Wi-Fi (b/g/n), microSD (max 32 GB)		174.4 x 114.6 x 8.3 mm	170 g	2017	1300 mAh	256 MB
Basic Lux (615)											2017		
Touch HD (631)	E Ink Carta	6″	1072 x 1448	300 ppi	8 GB	Freescale i.MX 6SoloLite	Micro USB, Wi-Fi (b/g/n), microSD/SDHC (max 32 GB), 3.5 mm headphone	Frontlight	113.5 x 175 x 9 mm	180 g	2016	1500 mAh	512 MB
InkPad 2 (840)	E Ink Pearl HD Plus	8″	1200 x 1600	250 ppi	4 GB / 8 GB	1 GHz	Micro USB, Wi-Fi (b/g/n), microSD (max 32 GB), 3.5 mm headphone	Frontlight, Audio, Audiobooks, Text-to-speech	195.5 x 162.8 x 7.37 mm	305 g	2016	2500 mAh	512 MB
Basic Touch 2 (625)	E Ink Carta	6″	800 x 600	166 ppi	8 GB	1000MHz	Micro USB, Wi-Fi (b/g/n), microSD/SDHC (max 32 GB)		174.4 x 114.6 x 8.3 mm	180 g	2016	1300 mAh	256 MB
Touch Lux 3 (626)	E Ink Carta HD	6″	1024 x 758	212 ppi	8 GB	1000MHz	Micro USB, Wi-Fi (b/g/n), microSD/SDHC (max 32 GB)	Frontlight	174.4 x 114.6 x 8.3 mm	180 g	2015	1500 mAh	256 MB
Touch Lux 2 (626)	E Ink Carta HD	6″	1024 x 758	212 ppi	8 GB	1000MHz	Micro USB, Wi-Fi (b/g/n), microSD/SDHC (max 32 GB)	Frontlight	174.4 x 114.6 x 8.3 mm	180 g	2015	1500 mAh	256 MB
Basic 2 (614)	E Ink Pearl	6″	800 x 600	166 ppi	4 GB / 8 GB	1 GHz	Micro USB, microSD (max 32 GB)		174.4 x 114.6 x 8.3 mm	188 g	2015	1300 mAh	256 MB
Sense/Fashion (630)	E Ink Pearl	6″	1024 x 758	212 ppi	4 GB	1 GHz	Micro USB, Wi-Fi (b/g/n), microSD/SDHC (max 32 GB)	Frontlight	151.4 x 110 x 7.5 mm	155 g	2014	1500 mAh	256 MB
InkPad (840)	E Ink Pearl	8″	1200 x 1600	250 ppi	4 GB	1 GHz	Micro USB, Wi-Fi (b/g/n), microSD (max 32 GB), 3.5 mm headphone	Frontlight, Audio, Audiobooks, Text-to-speech	195.5 x 162.8 x 7.37 mm	350 g	2014	2500 mAh	512 MB
Ultra (650)	E Ink Carta	6″	1024 x 758	212 ppi	4 GB	Freescale i.MX 6SoloLite	Micro USB, Wi-Fi (b/g/n), microSD (max 32 GB), 3.5 mm headphone	Frontlight, 5MP camera	162.7 x 106.7 x 7.9 mm	175 g	2014	1500 mAh	512 MB
Aqua (640)	E Ink Pearl	6″	800 x 600	166 ppi	4 GB	1000MHz	Micro USB, Wi-Fi (b/g/n)		174.4 x 114.6 x 9 mm	170 g	2014	1300 mAh	256 MB
CAD Reader											2014		
CAD Reader Flex											2014		
Basic Touch (624)	E Ink Pearl	6″	800 x 600	166 ppi	4 GB	1000MHz	Micro USB, Wi-Fi (b/g/n), microSD/SDHC (max 128 GB)		174.4 x 114.6 x 8.3 mm	191 g	2013	1300 mAh	256 MB
CoverReader											2013		
Mini (515)	E Ink	5″	800 x 600	200 ppi	4 GB	1000MHz	Micro USB, Wi-Fi (b/g/n)		100.02 x 142.33 x 7.2 mm	131 g	2013	1000 mAh	256 MB
Touch Lux (623)	E Ink Pearl HD	6″	1024 x 758	212 ppi	4 GB	800MHz	Micro USB, Wi-Fi (b/g/n), microSD/SDHC (max 32 GB), 3.5 mm headphone	Frontlight	175 x 114.5 x 9.5 mm	198 g	2013	1000 mAh	128 MB
Color Lux (801)	E Ink	8″	800 x 600		4 GB	800MHz	Micro USB, Wi-Fi (b/g/n), microSD (max 32 GB)	Frontlight	170 x 202 x 9 mm	300 g	2013	3000 mAh	256 MB
Touch (622)	E Ink Pearl	6″	800 x 600	166 ppi	2 GB	800MHz	Micro USB, Wi-Fi (b/g/n), microSD/SDHC (max 32 GB), 3.5 mm headphone		175 x 114.5 x 9.5 mm	195 g	2012	1000 mAh	128 MB
Basic New (613)	E Ink Vizplex	6″	600 x 800	166 ppi	2 GB	800MHz	Micro USB, Wi-Fi (b/g/n), microSD/SDHC (max 32 GB)		122.6 x 176.38 x 9.7 mm	180 g	2012	1000 mAh	128 MB
360 Plus (512)	E Ink Vizplex	5″	600 x 800	200 ppi	2 GB	800MHz	Micro USB, Wi-Fi (b/g/n), microSD/SDHC		146.2 x 123.2 x 13.8 mm, without cover 145 x 123.1 x 13.1 mm	180g, without cover 145 g	2011	1000 mAh	128 MB
Pro 912	E Ink Vizplex	9.7″	1200 x 825	155 ppi	2 GB	533MHz	Micro USB, Wi-Fi (b/g), microSD (max 32 GB), 3.5 mm headphone		193 x 263 x 11.5 mm	565 g	2011	1530 mAh	256 MB
Pro 612	E Ink Vizplex	6″	800 x 600	166 ppi	2 GB	533MHz	Micro USB, Wi-Fi (b/g), Bluetooth 2.1, microSD (max 32 GB)		132 x 182 x 10.6 mm	276 g	2011	1530 mAh	256 MB
Basic (611)	E Ink Vizplex	6″	600 x 800	166 ppi	2 GB	800MHz	Micro USB, Wi-Fi (b/g/n), microSD (max 32 GB)		122.6 x 176.38 x 9.7 mm	175 g	2011	1000 mAh	128 MB
Pro 903	E Ink Vizplex	9.7″	1200 x 825	155 ppi	2 GB	533MHz	Micro USB, Wi-Fi (b/g), Bluetooth 2.1, microSD (max 32 GB), 3G, 3.5 mm headphone		193 x 263 x 11.5 mm	581 g	2011	1530 mAh	256 MB
Pro 603	E Ink Vizplex	6″	800 x 600	166 ppi	2 GB	533MHz	Micro USB, Wi-Fi (b/g), Bluetooth 2.1, microSD (max 32 GB), 3G, 3.5 mm headphone		132 x 182 x 10.6 mm	280 g	2011	1530 mAh	256 MB
Pro 602	E Ink Vizplex	6″	800 x 600	166 ppi	2 GB	533MHz	Micro USB, Wi-Fi (b/g), Bluetooth 2.1, microSD (max 32 GB), 3.5 mm headphone		132 x 182 x 10.6 mm	250 g	2010	1530 mAh	256 MB
Pro 902	E Ink Vizplex	9.7″	1200 x 825	155 ppi	2 GB	533MHz	Micro USB, Wi-Fi (b/g), Bluetooth 2.1, microSD (max 32 GB), 3.5 mm headphone		193 x 263 x 11.5 mm	530 g	2010	1530 mAh	256 MB
Pro 901											2010		
302 Cookie											2009		
360											2009		
E301											2007		

Models from the same family sometimes use the same model numbers, such as:

- Touch HD PB631...
- Touch HD 2 PB631-2...

== See also ==
- Comparison of e-book readers
- Comparison of tablet computers
- Tablet computer
