= Comparison of iOS e-reader software =

The following tables compare general and technical features for a number of iOS e-book reader software. Each section corresponds to a major area of functionality in an e-book reader software. The comparisons are based on the latest released version.

== Navigation features ==
Product	Developer	Pagination	Rotation Lock	Auto-scroll	Progress indicator	Backward/forward	Table of Contents	Bookmarks	Resume	Cloud synchronisation	Go To	Full text search
Blio	K-NFB Reading Technology, Inc.	Yes	No	No	In-book only	Yes	Yes	Unlimited	Yes	No	Yes	Yes
Bluefire Reader	Bluefire Productions	Yes	Yes	No	In-book only	Yes	Yes	Unlimited	Yes	Yes	Yes	Yes
Apple Books	Apple	Yes	No	Manual	In-book only	Yes	Yes	Unlimited	Yes	Yes	Yes	Yes
Kindle	AMZN Mobile LLC	Yes	Yes	No	In library and in-book	Yes	Yes	Unlimited	Yes	Yes	Yes	Yes
Kobo Reading App	Kobo Inc.	Yes	Yes	No	In-book only	Yes	Yes	Last place marker only	Yes	Yes	Yes	No
Stanza	Lexcycle	Configurable	Yes	No	In library and in-book	Configurable	Yes	Unlimited	Yes	No	Yes	Yes
Product	Developer	Pagination	Rotation Lock	Auto-scroll	Progress indicator	Backward/forward	Table of Contents	Bookmarks	Resume	Cloud synchronisation	Go To	Full text search

== Display features ==
Product	Multi-column mode	Styles (bold/italic/etc.)	Page Turn Effects	Themes	Day/Night mode	Enable/Disable sleep mode	Brightness Control	Indent paragraph	Enable/Disable CSS	Enable/Disable hyphenation	Customize margins	Customize text alignment	Customize font	Customize spacing: line/paragraph
Blio	Yes	Yes	Yes	No	Yes	No	Yes	No	No	No	No	Justification only	Yes	No
Bluefire Reader	No	Yes	Yes	Yes	Yes	No	Vertical swipe	No	Yes	No	Pre-set choices only	Justification only	Yes	Line only
Apple Books	Yes	Yes	Yes	Yes	Yes	No	Yes	No	No	Yes	No	Yes	Yes	No
Kindle	Yes	Yes	Yes	Yes	Yes	No	Yes	No	No	No	Pre-set choices only	Yes	Yes	Line; pre-set choices only
Kobo Reading App	No	Yes	Yes	No	Yes	No	Vertical swipe	No	Yes	No	No	Yes	Yes	No
Stanza	No	Yes	Configurable	Yes	Yes	Yes	Vertical swipe	Yes	Yes	Yes	Yes	Yes	Yes	Yes
Product	Multi-column mode	Styles (bold/italic/etc.)	Page Turn Effects	Themes	Day/Night mode	Enable/Disable sleep mode	Brightness Control	Indent paragraph	Enable/Disable CSS	Enable/Disable hyphenation	Customize margins	Customize text alignment	Customize font	Customize spacing: line/paragraph

== Edit/tool features ==
Product	Highlight	Annotate	Edit meta-data	Online dictionary	Offline dictionary	Lookup Wikipedia	Translate	Share	TTS support (read aloud)	DRM support	Export to iTunes
Blio	Yes	Yes	No	Yes	Yes	Yes	No	No	Yes	No	Yes
Bluefire Reader	Yes	Yes	Author, Title, Publisher	Yes	No	No	No	Facebook, Twitter, eMail	No	Yes	Yes
Apple Books	Yes	Yes	No	Yes	Yes	Yes	No	Facebook, Twitter, eMail, SMS	yes, via VoiceOver	Apple FairPlay	Yes
Kindle	Yes	Yes	No	Yes	Yes	Yes	No	Facebook, Twitter	No	Yes	Yes
Kobo Reading App	Yes	Yes	No	Yes	No	Yes	No	Facebook, Twitter	No	Yes	Yes
Stanza	No	Yes	Yes	No	Yes	No	No	Facebook, Twitter, eMail	No	No	Yes
Product	Highlight	Annotate	Edit meta-data	Online dictionary	Offline dictionary	Lookup Wikipedia	Translate	Share	TTS support (read aloud)	DRM support	Export to iTunes

== Book source management features ==
Product	Book store(s)	Book search	In-app Epub import	Import via in-app Browser	OPDS catalog	Other import via	Tag books	Sort books
Blio	No	No	Yes	No	No	eMail (MIME type)	No	No
Bluefire Reader	Free ebook libraries only	Yes	No	No	No	eMail (MIME type) iTunes File Sharing Built-in Web Server	No	Yes
Apple Books	Apple Books Store	Yes	Yes	No	No	eMail (MIME type)	No	Yes
Kindle	No	No	No	No	No	iTunes File Sharing	No	No
Kobo Reading App	No	No	No	No	No	eMail (MIME type)	No	No
Stanza	No	Yes	Yes	No	Yes	Calibre (Bonjour) eMail (MIME type) iTunes File Sharing	Yes	Yes
Product	Book store(s)	Book search	In-app Epub import	Import via in-app Browser	OPDS catalog	Other import via	Tag books	Sort books

== Supported File Formats ==
See Comparison of e-book formats for details on the file formats.

Product	total # of formats	.cbr/.cbz	.chm	.djvu	.epub	.fb2	.html	.mobi	.pdb	.pdf	.rtf	.txt
Blio	2	No	No	No	Yes	No	No	No	No	Yes	No	No
Bluefire Reader	2	No	No	No	Yes	No	No	No	No	Yes	No	No
Apple Books	2	No	No	No	Yes	No	No	No	No	Yes	No	No
Kindle	2	No	No	No	No	No	No	Yes	No	Yes	No	No
Kobo Reading App	2	No	No	No	Yes	No	No	No	No	Yes	No	No
Stanza	5+	Yes	No	Yes	Yes	No	No	No	Yes	Yes	No	No
Product	total # of formats	.cbr/.cbz	.chm	.djvu	.epub	.fb2	.html	.mobi	.pdb	.pdf	.rtf	.txt

== License ==
Product	Free	License
Blio	Partial (voices cost)	
Bluefire Reader	Partial (Cloudshelf edition is free)	Proprietary
Apple Books	Yes	Proprietary
Kindle	Yes	
Kobo Reading App	Yes	
Stanza	Yes	Proprietary

== Special features ==
Product	Special features
Blio	Support for the visually impaired
Bluefire Reader	Optional PDF password protection Localized in English, French, German, Norwegian, Icelandic, Italian, Portuguese, Romanian, Danish Support for Chinese, Japanese, and Korean language epub3 format including Vertical writing mode and R2L page order Supports multiple concurrent Adobe user account activations, both Adobe ID and Vendor ID accounts Export notes and highlights to email Collections Feature for organizing user Library
Apple Books	Apple Books can read text aloud to the user.
Kindle	Ebooks can be emailed to an auto-generated Amazon email address
Kobo Reading App	Strictly enforces registration with Kobo Support for magazine subscriptions. Extensive social media support via Facebook. Reading statistics and achievements.
Stanza	Cover Flow (Note: Not on the iPad) Extensive options for library sorting Customizable background picture & transparency settings Has some stability problems on iOS >= 5.0 Stanza is not being updated any more
Product	Special features

== Discontinued software ==
- The Readmill app, introduced in February 2011, read numerous formats on Android and iOS devices but shut down on July 1, 2014.
- Also the Blio, DL Reader and Stanza app are no longer available.

== See also ==
- Comparison of Android e-reader software
- Comparison of e-book formats - includes both device and software formats
- Comparison of e-readers - includes hardware e-book readers
