= Stanza (disambiguation) =

A stanza is a unit of poetry within a larger poem.

Stanza may also refer to:

- Lexcycle Stanza, a program for reading eBooks, digital newspapers, and other digital publications
- Nissan Stanza, an automobile manufactured by Nissan
- Stanza Poetry Festival, a poetry festival in St. Andrews, Scotland
