= Blio (disambiguation) =

Blio may refer to:

- Blio, an ebook reading software program
- BLiO, an abbreviation of the chemical lithium boron monoxide (see article Dictionary of chemical formulas/Merge/B)
- Berlin-Lichterfelde Ost railway station (BLIO), a railway station in Berlin, Germany.
