= ODPS =

ODPS may refer to:

- Ohio Department of Public Safety
- Oklahoma Department of Public Safety
- Open Publication Distribution System
