= Nissan Violet =

Compact car produced by Nissan (1973-1992)

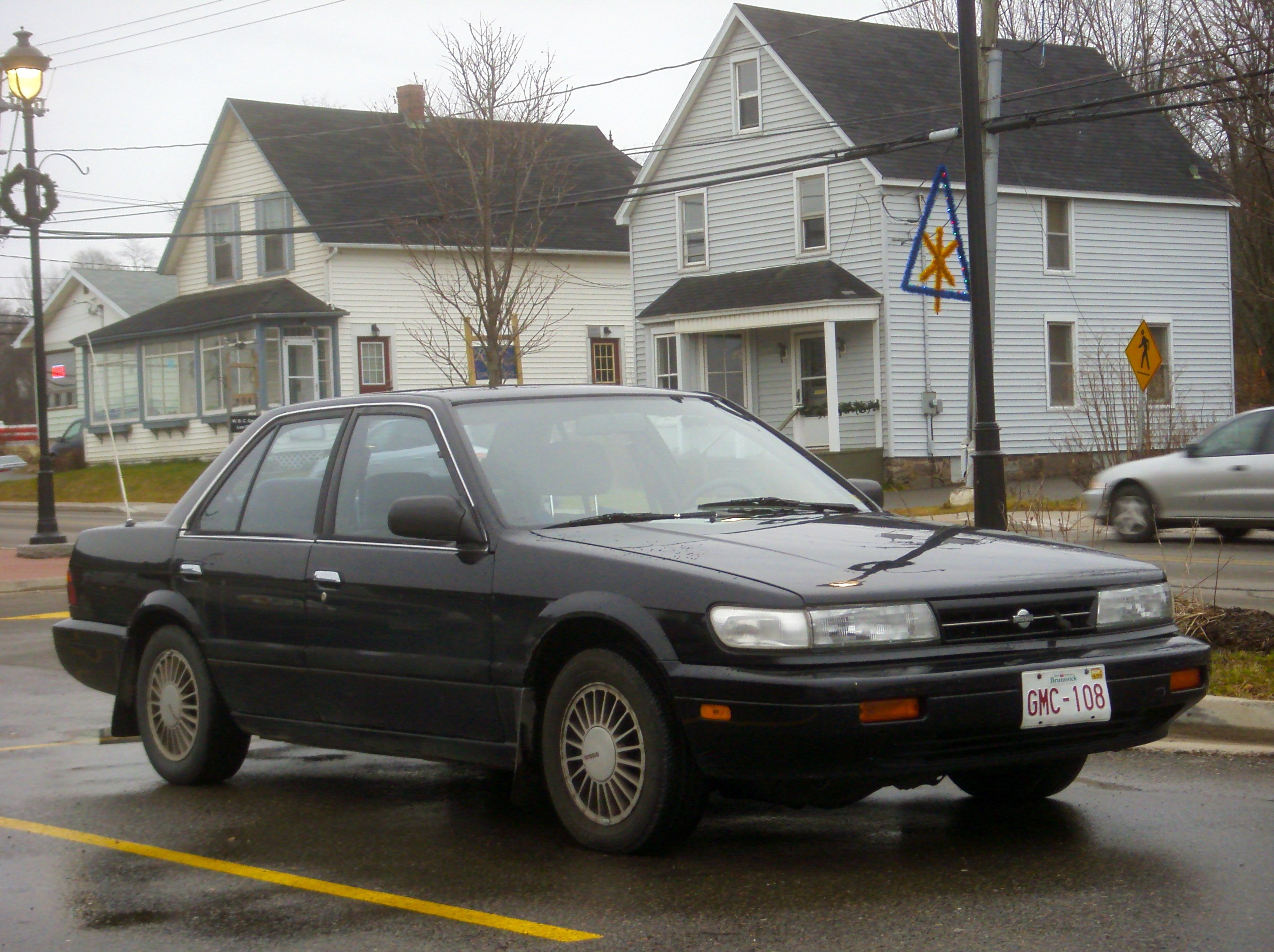
- 1991 Nissan Stanza GXE (U12, Canada)

Overview
- Manufacturer: Nissan (Nissan Shatai)
- Also called: Datsun Violet; Nissan Auster; Datsun/Nissan Stanza
- Production: 1973–1992
- Assembly: Oppama Plant and Hiratsuka Plants, Kanagawa, Japan; Rosslyn, Gauteng, South Africa

Body and chassis
- Class: Compact
- Layout: Front-engine, RWD (1973–1981); Front-engine, FWD (1982–1992)

Chronology
- Successor: Nissan Altima (US); Nissan Bluebird; Nissan Primera (Europe); Nissan Tiida

The Nissan Violet is a compact car that was first released in Japan in 1973 and produced until 1992. It was initially exclusive to Nissan's Japanese Nissan Cherry Store dealerships, as a larger companion to the Nissan Cherry.

In 1977, the second generation model arrived. This was split into two additional lines, the Nissan Auster and the Nissan Stanza. All three models bore the A10 series identifier, and were built in Japan at the Hiratsuka and Yokosuka assembly plants. The Stanza was exclusive to Japanese Nissan dealerships called Nissan Satio Store as a larger companion to the smaller Nissan Sunny, and the Auster triplet was exclusive to Nissan Prince Store locations as a larger companion to the Nissan Langley.

A new third generation front-wheel drive model was launched in 1981, changing the series name again to T11, and sharing its platform with the Compact MPV Nissan Prairie/Multi/Stanza Wagon. Final versions were Nissan Bluebirds series U12 rebadged for some international markets. In most export markets the car was originally sold as the Datsun 140J or 160J depending on the engine; this name was then gradually changed to Nissan Stanza in most markets in line with Nissan's phasing out of the Datsun brand in its export markets in the early 1980s; in Europe for instance it was sold as the "Datsun-Nissan Stanza" for a short time until the Datsun name was dropped completely in 1984.

The Stanza/Auster/Violet were discontinued in 1992. The Stanza was replaced by the Nissan Altima in North America; the Stanza was replaced by the Nissan Bluebird in Japan, and by the Primera in Europe.

== 710 series (1973–1977) ==
Nissan Violet 710 series
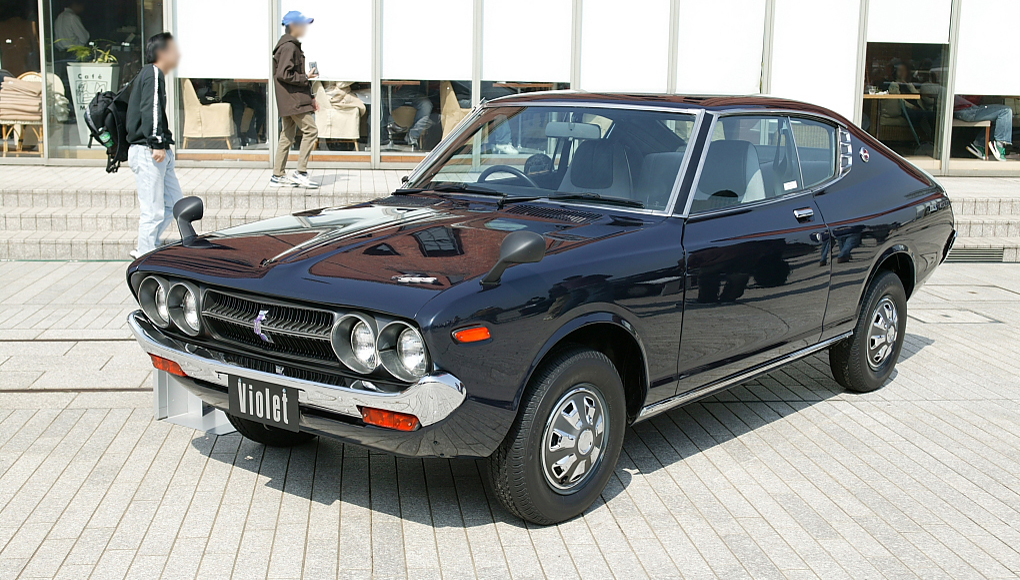
- Datsun Violet Hardtop Coupe (710, Japan)

Overview
- Model code: 710
- Also called: Datsun 140J/160J; Datsun 160U/180U (South Africa); Datsun 710; Datsun Sedan/Guayín; Yue Loong Violet 707 (Yue Loong, TW)
- Production: Japan: 1973–1977; Taiwan: 1973–1979; Mexico: 1974–1978

Body and chassis
- Body style: 2-door hardtop coupé; 2/4-door fastback sedan; 4-door notchback sedan; 5-door estate/van
- Layout: FR layout
- Related: Datsun Truck 720

Powertrain
- Engine: 1428 cc L14 I4 (710/711); 1567 cc J16 OHV I4 (Taiwan); 1595 cc L16/L16E/L16P I4 (P710/711); 1770 cc L18/L18P I4 (R710); 1952 cc L20B I4 (H710/WH710, export only)
- Transmission: 4/5-speed manual; 3-speed auto

Dimensions
- Wheelbase: 2,450 mm (96.5 in)
- Length: 4,120 mm (162.2 in)
- Width: 1,580 mm (62.2 in)
- Height: 1,375 mm (54.1 in)
- Curb weight: 1,005 kg (2,216 lb)

Introduced in January 1973, the Nissan Violet was a smaller version of the Datsun Bluebird 610, which was sold outside Japan under Nissan's Datsun brand as the Datsun 140J/160J — except in the United States where it was marketed simply as the Datsun 710. This model was built as a two-door saloon, two-door coupé, four-door fastback, (and later as a regular four-door saloon), estate, and as a van. Introducing the Violet allowed Nissan to moderately increase the dimensions of the existing Datsun Bluebird.

The sporty SSS model has rear independent suspension, others have a leaf sprung rear. Aside from the different name, the North American market 710 received large separate bumpers rather than the curved, fitted pieces used in other markets to comply with United States bumper legislation in 1973. Early export market cars were fitted with tiny chrome cover plates to hide the holes left on top of the front fenders by the Japanese market rear view mirrors. The most powerful version offered in Japan was the fuel injected 1600 SSS-E with 110 PS (81 kW) JIS at 6200 rpm. In export markets the twin-carb 160J SSS claimed 95 PS (70 kW) DIN, five more than the regular 160J. In Japan, the 1800 cc engine arrived in October 1975 and was only available running on LPG, for taxi use.

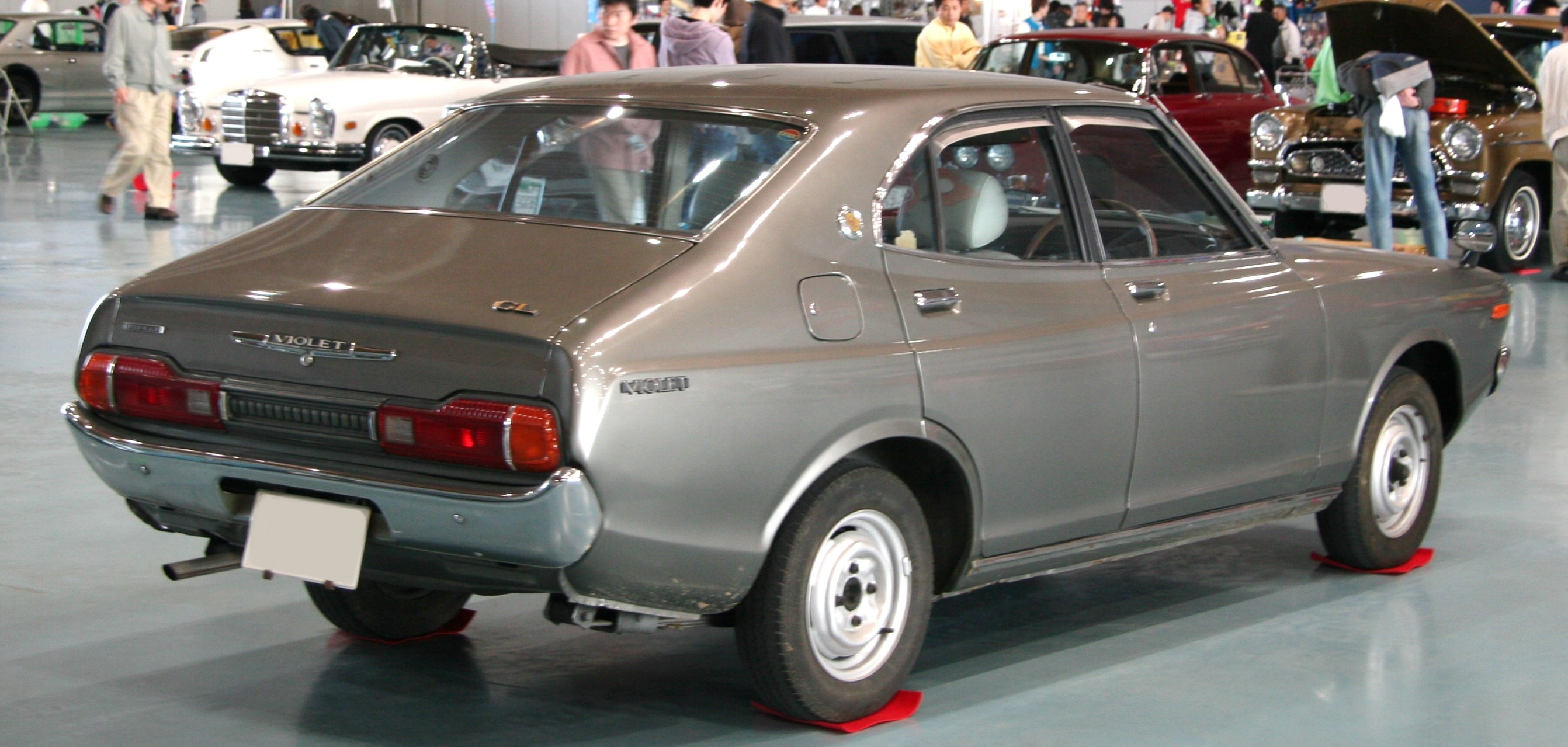
Datsun Violet GL fastback sedan (710, Japan)

This vehicle was available for sale around the same time as the first generation Toyota Carina. The original four-door bodywork was quite swoopy, with a fastback line. It was one of the first Nissan products to introduce "coke bottle styling", an appearance that had debuted internationally during the 1960s and 1970s. Its controversial appearance led to a certain number of customer complaints, not only about the looks but also at the limited rear vision and dark rear cabin - especially for children. Taxi companies refused to purchase any more Violets, and in a rather drastic facelift gradually introduced beginning in February 1976 Nissan resorted to replacing the entire rear end (including the roof panel and the doors) with more traditional, notchback bodywork. This provided more space and comfort for passengers, while also minimizing blind spots.

This version also received a new chassis code, 711, while the smaller-engined part of the range gradually became replaced by the newly introduced, carburetted version of the 1600. For the home market, the engines were also revised to meet the new, 1976 emissions standards. The coupés and vans/wagons did not undergo any bodywork modification. The two-door sedan was discontinued, while the coupé received the new chassis code and remained on sale alongside the four-door 711 and the 710 Van.

North America

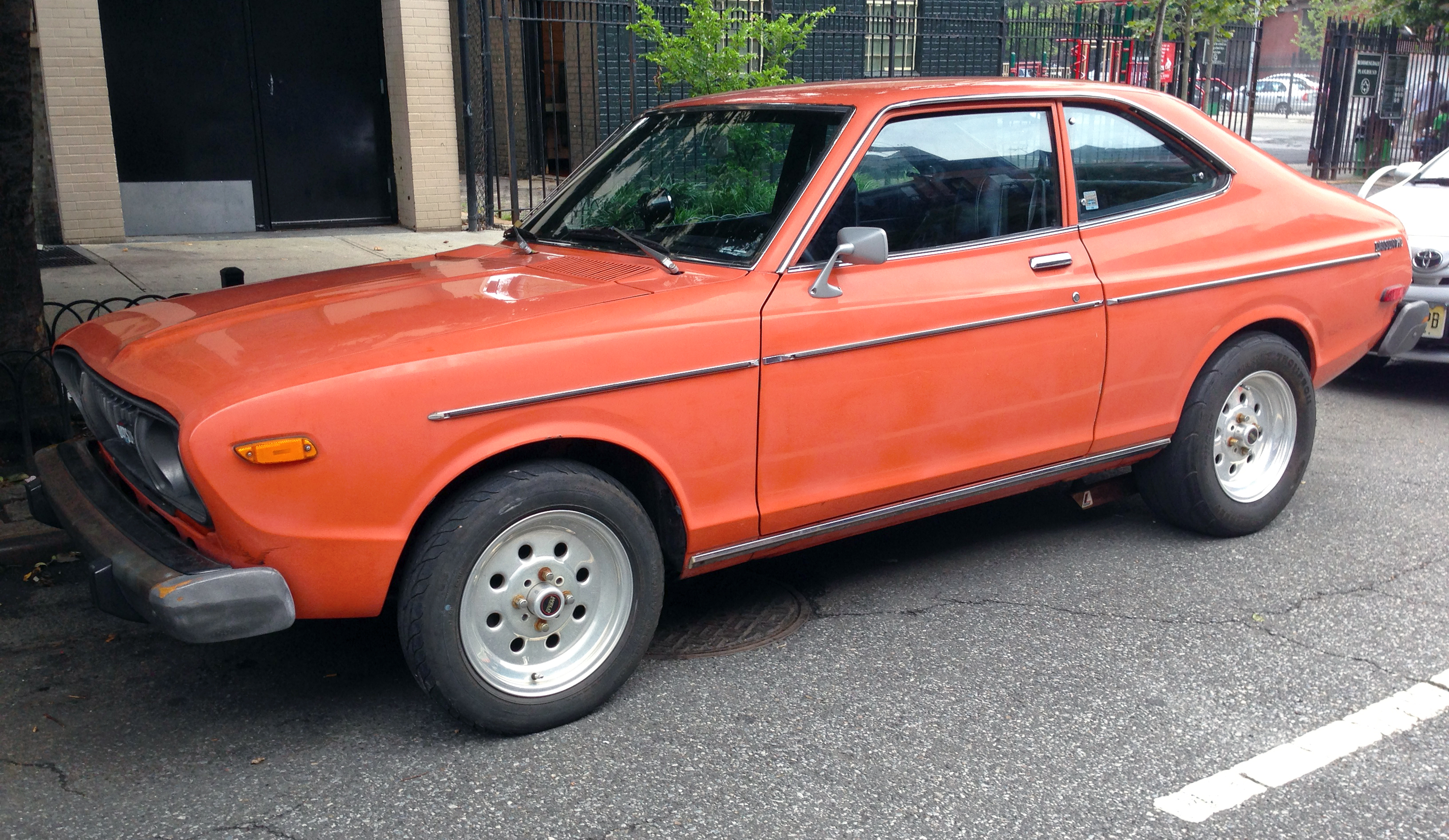
Datsun 710 two-door sedan (1975-76, US)

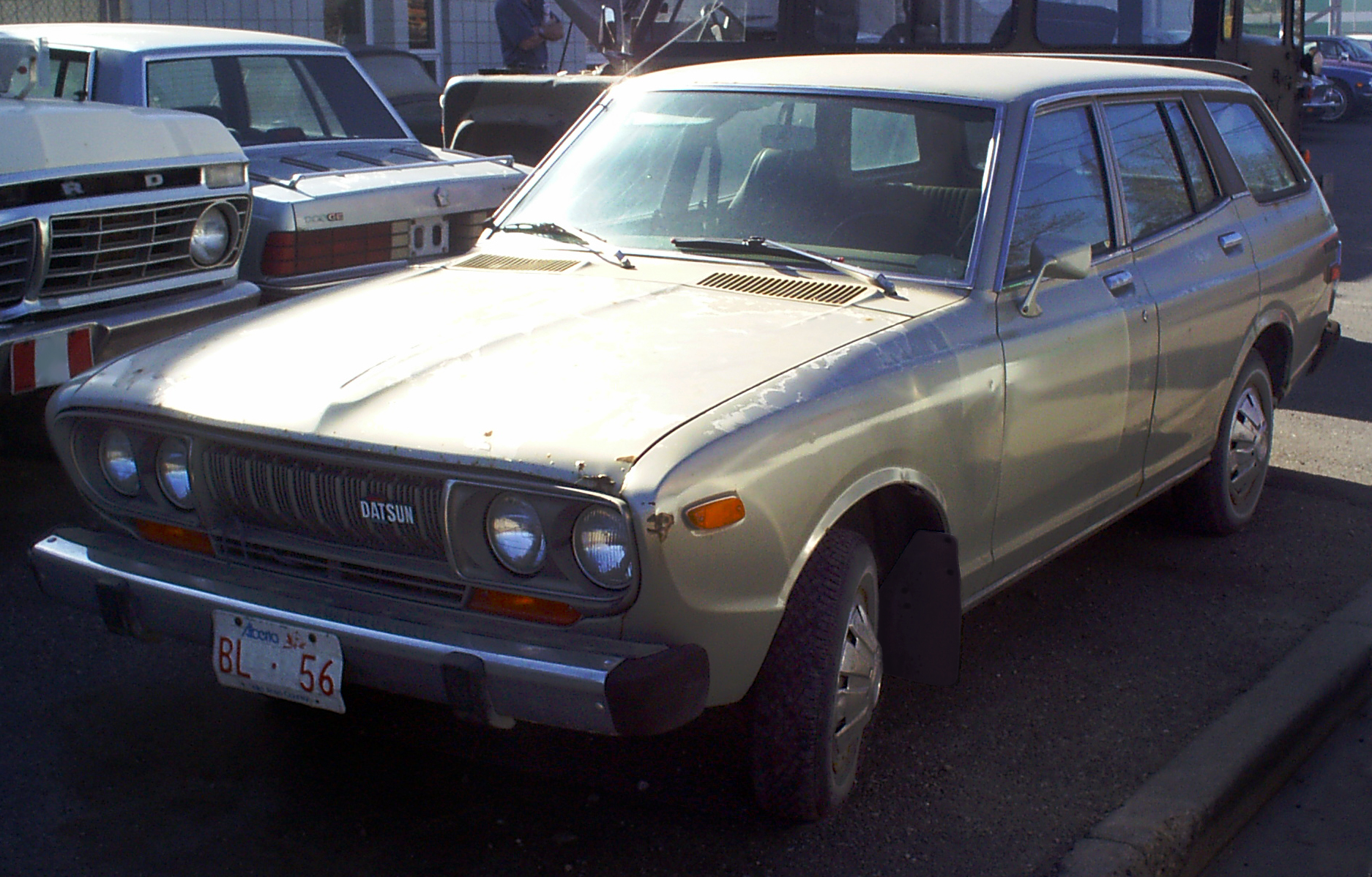
The North American-spec Datsun 710 Station Wagon

In the United States and Canada, the car was sold simply as the "Datsun 710". Two- or four-door sedans, a two-door coupé, and a five-door station wagon were available. Introduced for the 1974 model year, the 710 switched from the original 1770 cc, 90-horsepower (67 kW) engine to the 2-litre L20B engine also used in the 610. The 1975s produce 97 or 94 hp (72 or 70 kW) (SAE Net) in 49-state and Canadian trim versus California-spec cars. The federal/Canadian version took leaded fuel and depended on an EGR system for pollution control, while the California cars have a catalytic converter and require unleaded petrol. Gross horsepower ratings are 110 and 107 respectively. Aside from the new engine, the 710 saw some additional modifications for 1975: the steering was adjusted to decrease driver effort, while noise levels were reduced, and gear ratios were adjusted to boost petrol mileage. Externally, the bumper overriders received a slight chrome molding in the middle.

Mysteriously, while wagons usually have a smaller petrol tank of 11.9 US gal (45 L) rather than 13.2 US gal (50 L), the California-market 710 wagon has the same size petrol tank as the sedans and hardtops.

=== Foreign assembly ===
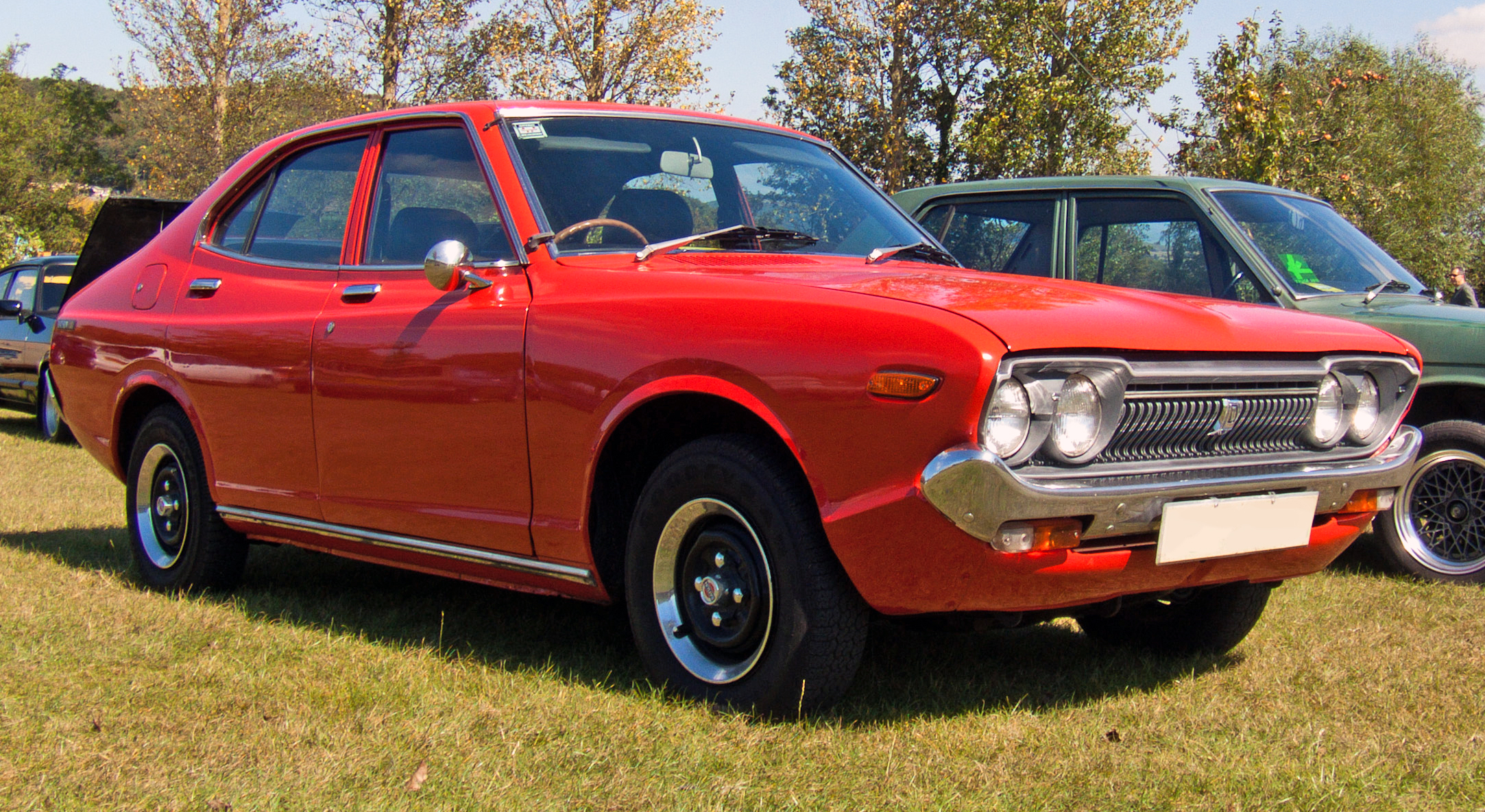
1974 Datsun Violet 140J (710, UK)

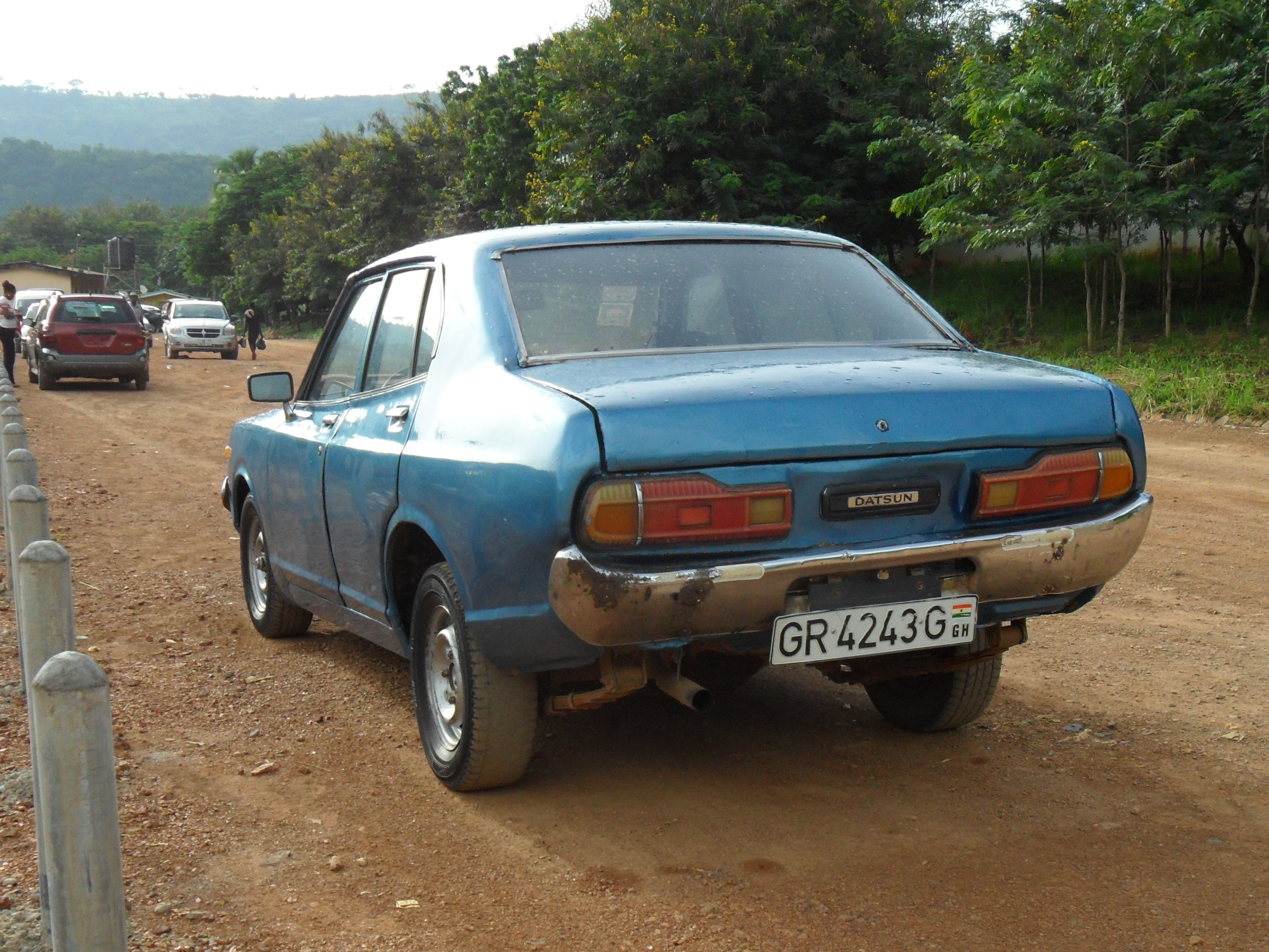
Rear view of late, facelifted model with squared off rear

Taiwan

In Taiwan the Violet was introduced in 1973 under the name Yue Loong Violet 707 and replaced the successful Datsun Bluebird there. It remained in production until 1982 The Yue Loong Violet was usually offered with the OHV J16 engine. The VIP Brougham was a luxury version of the Violet with leather seats and wood interior.

Mexico

For the Mexican domestic car market, the 710-series Violet was produced from 1973 to 1978 at Nissan's CIVAC assembly plant, near Cuernavaca, Mexico. At the time, Nissan Mexico offered a unique passenger-vehicles lineup, the Datsun Bluebird range (the 510-series and the 410, previously), integrated only by the 4-door saloon and Wagon versions of the Bluebird, respectively commercialized as the Datsun Sedan and Datsun Guayín (Guayín is a moniker in Mexican spanish for "Station Wagon"). In 1974, going on with the same business strategy, the 710-series Violet was introduced to the Mexican car market badged as the new Datsun 160J, the replacement for the single-offered Bluebird lineup.

The Mexican 710 Violet range was integrated only by the 4-door Saloon alongside the Wagon, lacking the sporty 2-door/coupe bodies offered in some other countries. The fastback-styled 710 4-door saloon design was marketed from 1974 to 1977, being replaced in 1978 with the notchback-styled 711 Violet (which intended to improve the fastback's bad rear visibility complained by some customers). All Mexican 710 Violets featured the 1.6-litre carbureted engine (160J), coupled to a 4-speed manual gearbox, and an optional 3-speed automatic gearbox starting in 1978.

From a time in the Mexican popular slang, sometimes this car is referred to as "bolillo", the spanish word for a bread roll, due to its similar rounded shape. For 1979, the 710 range was superseded by the correspondent next generation A10-series Violet in the Nissan Mexico lineup.

New Zealand

New Zealand, as a result of the government's temporary lift of import licensing restrictions (the result of high consumer demand for cars, which local CKD assemblers and built-up importers could not meet with the usual licensing restrictions and high import duties of up to 55%, plus sales tax up to 60%) saw considerable CBU imports of the Datsun 140J four-door sedan and 160J two-door during 1973 and 1974.

Due to the short notice and short timeframe of the licence requirement relaxation, the cars imported differed slightly in specification from shipment to shipment - some had Japanese market amber front park lights, front guard-mounted exterior rear view mirrors and 'Violet' badges; later units had clear lenses and 140J/160J badging.

Several hundred 140J sedans entered New Zealand through the Port of Timaru for the South Island market and all were presold before they arrived. They were in demand as they were better specified as standard (tinted glass, AM pushbutton radio, etc.) than the NZ-assembled CKD kit imported models, which consisted of the 1200 sedan and wagon, and 180B (Bluebird) and 260C (Cedric) sedans.

Almost-new 140Js were often resold soon after first registration for hundreds of dollars more than their retail prices, such was the model line's initial popularity. The Japanese assembly quality of the 140J was better than the NZ-built Datsuns of the time which were assembled by outside assembly contractors - Nissan themselves did not open its own 'temporary' plant in Mt Roskill, Auckland, until the mid-1970s and a dedicated, purpose-built factory in Wiri in 1978.

South Africa

In South Africa, the 1976 "711" facelift arrived in October 1976 and continued in production for a while longer than in Japan. It was sold as the Datsun 160U or 180U, depending on engine fitment. Deluxe and SSS sedans as well as an SSS Hardtop were available. A batch of 100 SSS models (some of which were Bluebirds) with special "Mexican" upholstery was also built in 1978.

== A10 series (1977–1981) ==
Nissan Violet A10 series
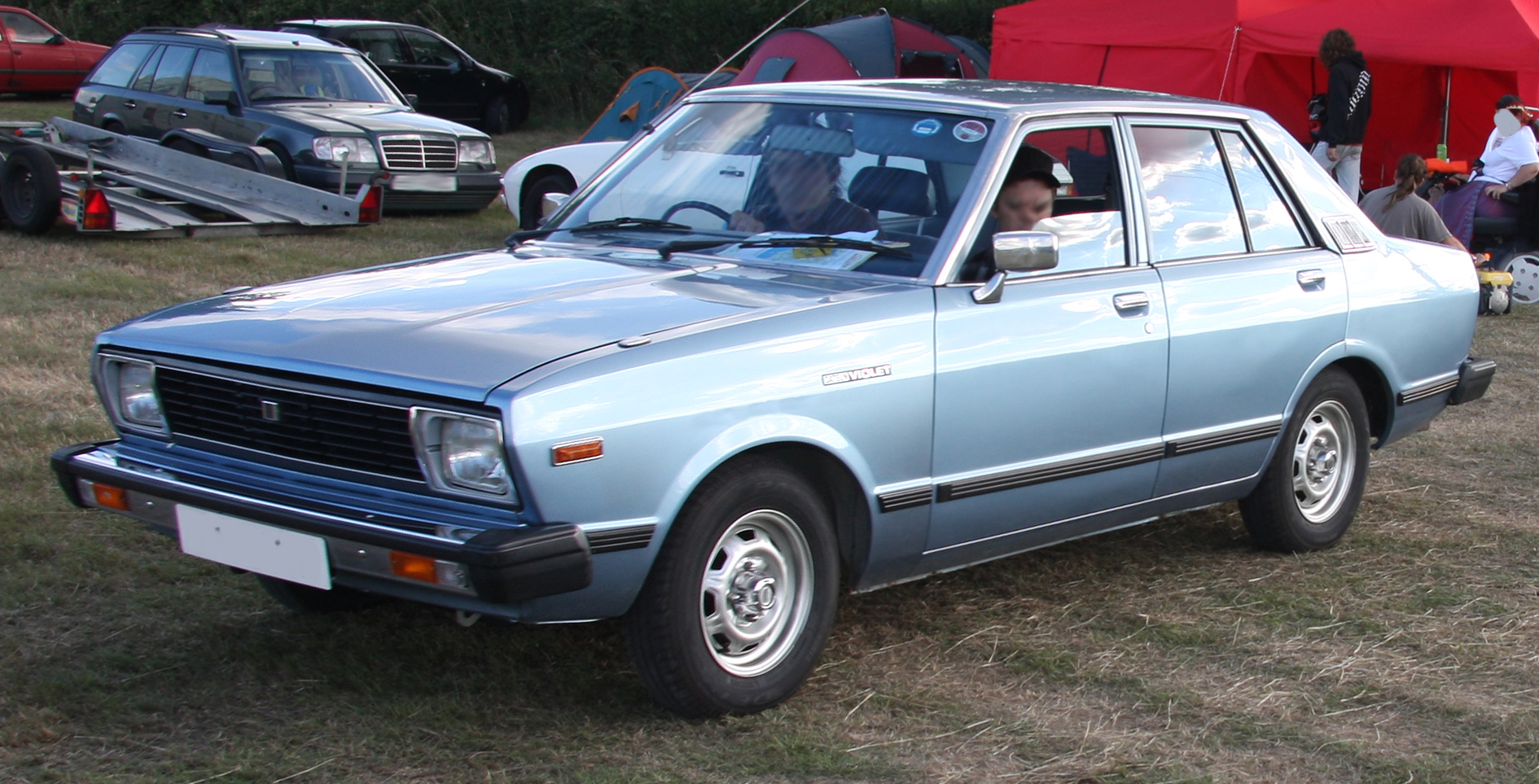
- Datsun Violet 140J (UK)

Overview
- Model code: A10
- Also called: Datsun 510 (USA); Datsun Sedan/Guayin (Mexico); Datsun/Nissan Stanza; Datsun Violet; Datsun J-series (1600J/1800J; South Africa); Datsun 140J/160J/180J; Nissan Auster; Yue Loong 709/711/712
- Production: 1977.05–1981; Mexico: 1979–1984
- Assembly: Japan; Australia; Rosslyn, Gauteng, South Africa; CIVAC, Mexico

Body and chassis
- Body style: 2/4-door saloon; 3-door hatchback coupé; 5-door liftback; 5-door station wagon
- Layout: FR layout
- Related: Nissan Silvia

Powertrain
- Engine: 1397 cc A14 I4 (A10/11); 1595 cc L16/L16S/L16E I4 (PA10); 1595 cc Z16S/Z16E I4 (PA11); 1770 cc Z18/Z18E I4 (RA11); 1952 cc L20B I4 (HA10); 1952 cc Z20S I4 (HA10)
- Transmission: 4/5-speed manual 3-speed automatic

Dimensions
- Wheelbase: 2,400 mm (94.5 in)
- Length: 4,080–4,325 mm (160.6–170.3 in)
- Width: 1,600–1,620 mm (63.0–63.8 in)
- Height: 1,320–1,410 mm (52.0–55.5 in)
- Curb weight: 870–1,367 kg (1,918–3,014 lb)

When the first generation Violet was replaced in May 1977, it grew more rational and somewhat larger than the over-designed original model, which had been severely criticized and also met with buyer resistance. Nissan increased the glass area by ten percent vis-à-vis its predecessor. It was also joined by two badge engineered versions: the slightly more expensive Nissan Auster went on sale alongside the Violet and was aiming for an air of "quality and youthfulness." This was accomplished by having a different grille treatment, a somewhat altered dashboard with more round gauges, and offering the option of a dog-leg, five-speed manual transmission. The Auster lineup also received a rear stabilizer bar, for improved handling.

The more luxurious, more "European" Stanza followed in August 1977; it was only offered in the higher equipment levels and was also differentiated by having a different bonnet and single rectangular lights rather than the twin round units seen on the Violet and Auster. Stanza, which is Italian for "room" or "apartment", was sold via Nissan Japan dealerships Nissan Saito Store. The more basic Violet, positioned as an affordable family car one level above the Nissan Sunny, was sold at dealership locations called Nissan Cherry Store. The Nissan Auster, which is named for the Latin equivalent of the Greek god Notus for the south wind, was available at Nissan Prince Store. In Australia, the A10 was called the Datsun Stanza, while in Canada and the United States it was sold as the Datsun 510, a name which recalled the successes of the previous Datsun 510.

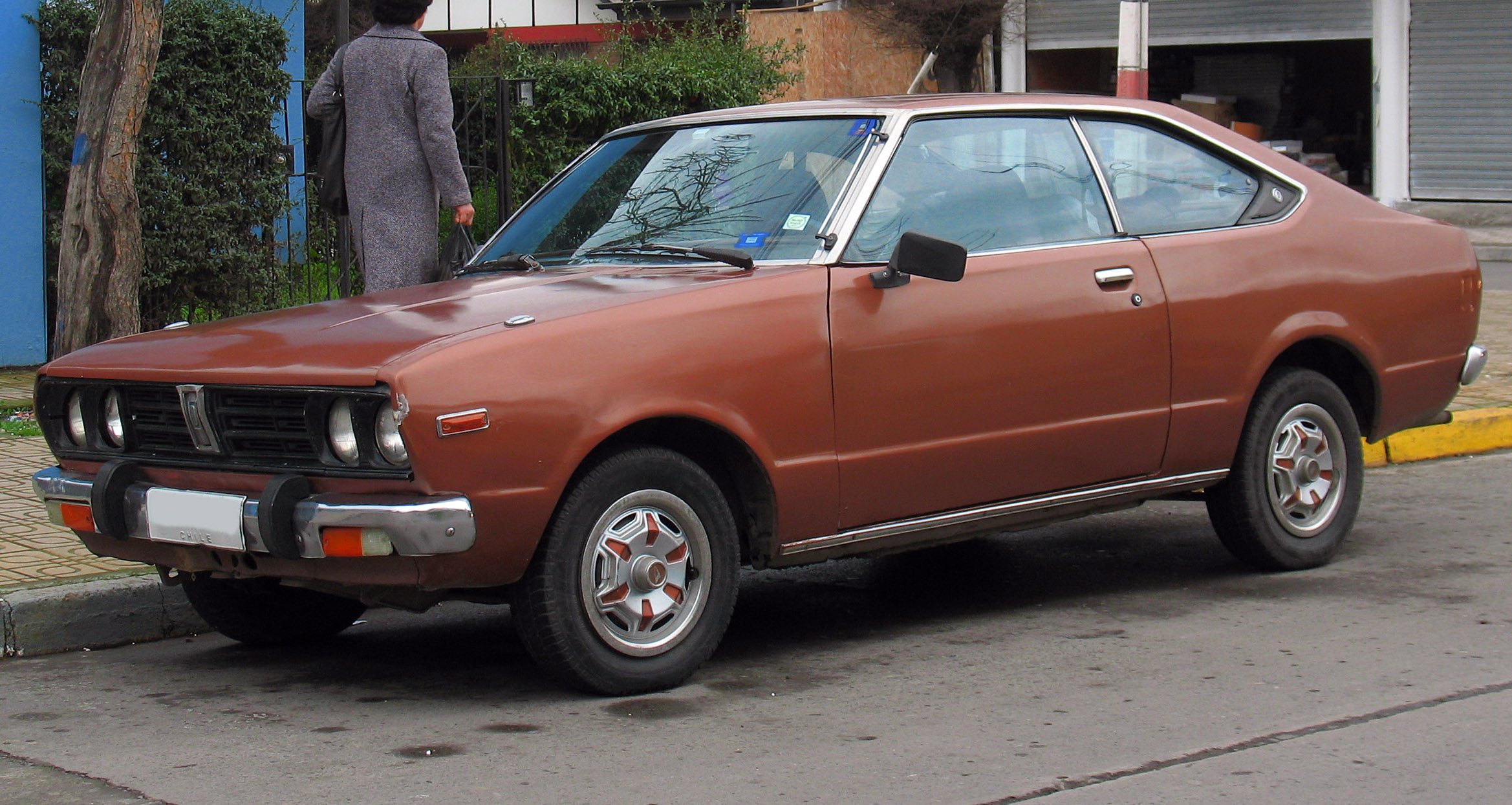
Datsun 160J Coupé (A10)

The 1.6-litre L16 had been updated in February 1976 and continued as a carry-over from the previous generation, but the 1.4-litre L14 engine was replaced with the new A-series engine (not available in the Stanza), producing 80 PS (59 kW) at 6,000 rpm. North American market cars received a two-litre version of the L engine, to compensate for power loss to emissions control system and the added weight for federally mandated safety equipment. In May 1978 the car underwent a facelift, becoming the A11 in the process. At the same time, the L16 engines were replaced by the cross-flow Z16, to meet newer stricter emissions rules. Nissan introduced their emissions control technology with this generation, called NAPS, and the cars received a new chassis code of A11. The more luxurious Stanza was never available with the 1.4-litre engine in Japan, only with a 1.6 until larger engines joined the lineup.

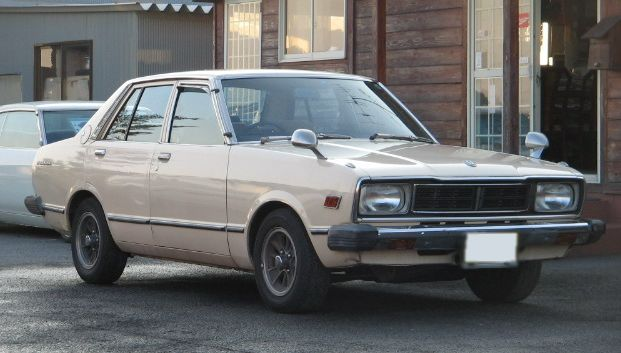
Nissan Stanza (A10, Japan)

In November 1978 a 1.8-litre engine was added at the top of the line-up, mainly for the domestic Japanese market. The 1800 "NAPS-Z" engine was initially only available in the more luxurious Stanza model and received the RA11 chassis code. It was available either carburetted or fuel injected, with 105 or 115 PS (77 or 85 kW) at 6,000 rpm respectively.

Five body styles were on offer: two- and four-door saloons, a three-door hatchback coupé ("Violet Openback" and "Auster Multi-Coupé"), a 5-door hatchback (only introduced in August 1979, quite late in the car's production run) and a five-door estate. The three-door coupé offered a split, folding rear seat which increased flexibility, but the lowered roofline limited headroom for rear passengers, effectively making this bodystyle a 2+2.

The five-door liftback Stanza was marketed as the "Stanza Resort" in the Japanese domestic market, and given the chassis model code T10. The five-door bodywork only became available in the Auster and Violet versions as of April 1980, meaning that they were only built for fourteen months as the car was replaced by the T11 generation in June 1981. The A10/A11 wagon was not replaced in 1981, with the all-new Nissan Prairie or Nissan Vanette instead filling its place for cargo carrying duties in the Japanese market.

Transmissions offered were a four-speed manual (not available on Auster 1600s), a five-speed manual (not available with the 1400 engine), and a three-speed automatic. This generation was available for sale around the same time as the first generation Toyota Celica Camry and the Honda Accord, which formed direct competitors in the domestic marketplace.

=== Export markets ===
==== Australia ====
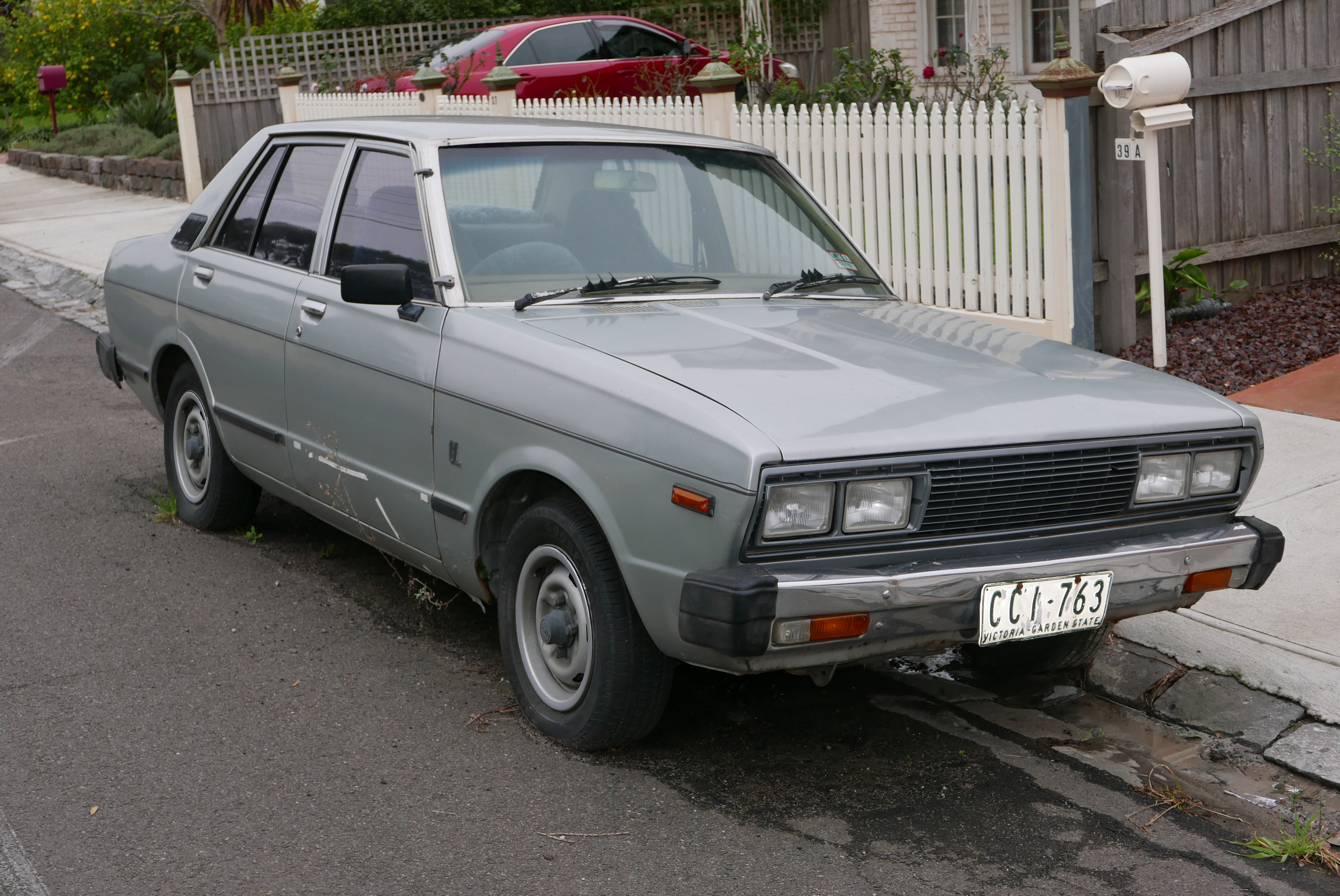
1982 Datsun Stanza GL sedan (A10, Australia)

The Stanza was assembled in Australia from 1978 to 1982, in 1.6-litre four-door saloon form, primarily to fill a gap between the Sunny and 200B. Trims available were "GL", "GX", and sporty "SSS".

While popular with buyers, the Australian Stanza was heavily criticized by the motoring journalists of the day (particularly Wheels Magazine), who regarded the car as being "unadventurous", particularly with regard to its styling and conventional drivetrain.

In 1979, 120 two-door coupé models were assembled in Australia, apparently due to a mix-up with Nissan Australia's kit ordering system. They were released into the market anyway with no promotion, and promptly sold out.

==== New Zealand ====
The A10 series was sold in limited numbers as the Datsun 160J in New Zealand. A batch of three-door hatchbacks were imported when assemblers could not keep up with demand with the locally assembled 120Y Sunny and 180B models.

==== Europe ====
In the United Kingdom, this generation was marketed as the Datsun Violet, and was sold in 1.4 L "GL" and 1.6 L "GL" engine/trim combinations. No estate models were offered. In the rest of Europe it was usually sold as the 160J (or 140J), a variety of bodystyle and equipment combinations were offered, with a Coupé SSS with twin SU-carburetors available at the top of the lineup. Power outputs were 63 PS (46 kW) for the 140J, 81–83 PS (60–61 kW) for the 160J, and 87 PS (64 kW) for the 160J SSS. A fuel-injected version of the 160J was also available in some European markets, with 86 PS (63 kW).

==== Taiwan ====
The A10 Violet was locally assembled in Taiwan by Yue Loong until at least 1985. It was sold as the YLN 709, 711, and 712, depending on which facelift version. In later years (as the 712) it was only available with hatchback bodywork and a 1.4-litre engine.

==== Thailand ====
In Thailand it was marketed as the Datsun Stanza (with additional Nissan badges during the transition period) by local assembler Siam Motors. It was only available with SU-carburetted 1.6-litre engines, producing 100 PS (74 kW) SAE in the four-door sedan and 105 PS (77 kW) in the sportier liftback coupé version.

==== Mexico ====
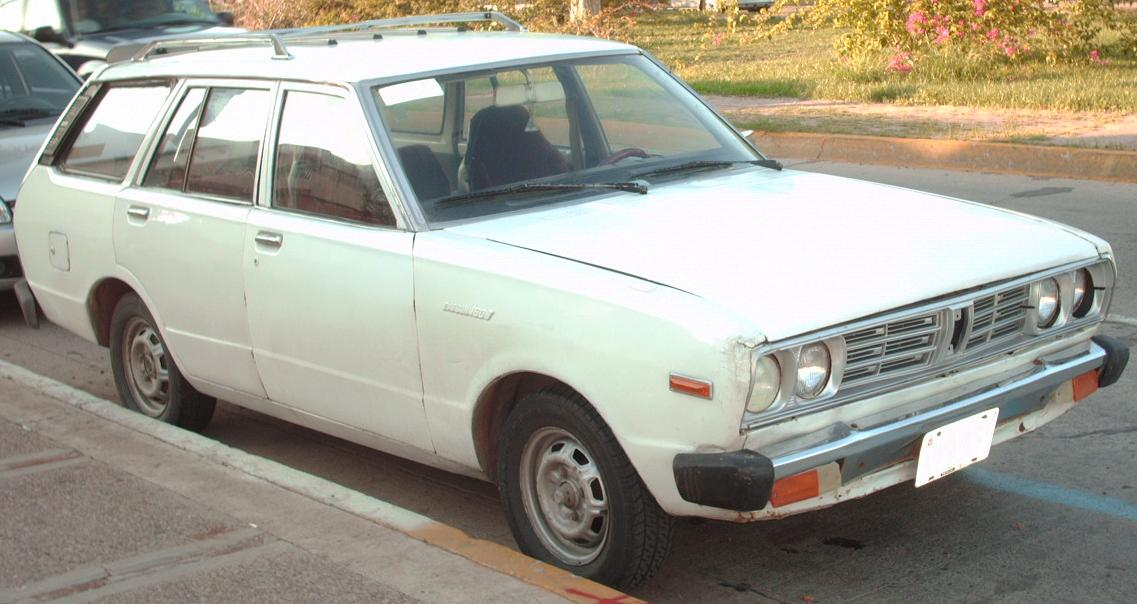
Datsun 160J Wagon (A10, Mexico)

The A10-series Violet was commercialized in the Mexican car market from 1978 to early 1984. Introduced as a 1979 model, it superseded the previous 710-series as the second generation "Datsun 160J". At first, the Mexican A10 Violet range only included the 4-door saloon and the Wagon, being (as previously) respectively marketed as "Datsun Sedan" and "Datsun Guayin" (badged Violet Van in Japan), continuing the former promotion strategy of the Nissan Mexico lineup. For the first time here, the 2-door saloon version was added to the range.

From 1979 to 1981, the Mexican-produced A10 units had pretty much the same design of the Japanese-spec A10 Violets produced between the 1977-1979 lapse. The front grille of the 4-door and wagon featured the same doubled-circle headlight set (i.e. two pair of circular lamps), while the 2-door saloon sported a distinctive front grille, with only a set of single circular right and left lamps.

For 1982, the Mexican A10 cars sported the same facelift works made on the 1979-1981 Japanese-produced Violets, going on a bit with the North American-spec A10 units (marketed in the USA as Datsun 510, hinting then the well-gained reputation of the former 510-series Bluebird model of the late 60s-early 70s). This slight facelift focused majorly on the updated front grille, featuring a singled or doubled set of new squared or rectangular-shaped headlights. From here, the commercialization of the Mexican A10 lineup changed to Datsun 180J, referring the more powerful 1.8-litre carbureted engine swap.

Also in 1982, the 5-door liftback/hatchback version of the A10 Violet certainly was launched toward the Mexican market, as Datsun Samurai. It intended to be a sleek, sporty while -by then- modern style saloon in the Nissan Mexico lineup.

In 1984, in a context of the Nissan's brand global name unification, the Datsun brand name was phased out off the world's market, in favor of the single Nissan brand name. Thus, the Mexican A10 Violet production was phased out by Nissan Mexico, switching its manufacture to the domestic market production of the B11 Sunny/Sentra range by then, launched as the all-new Nissan Tsuru (1st. gen / B11).

==== North America ====
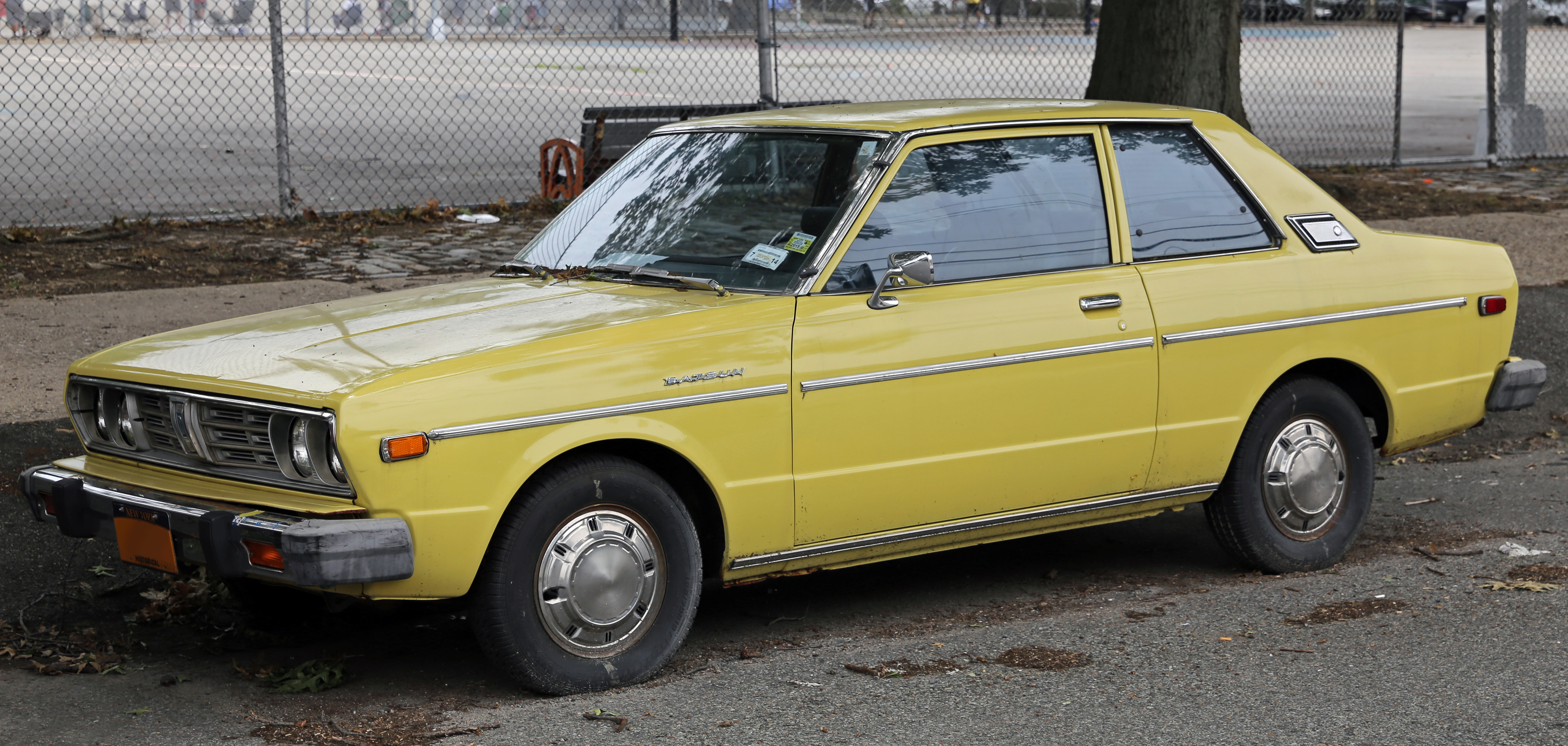
1978 Datsun 510 2-door Sedan (USA)

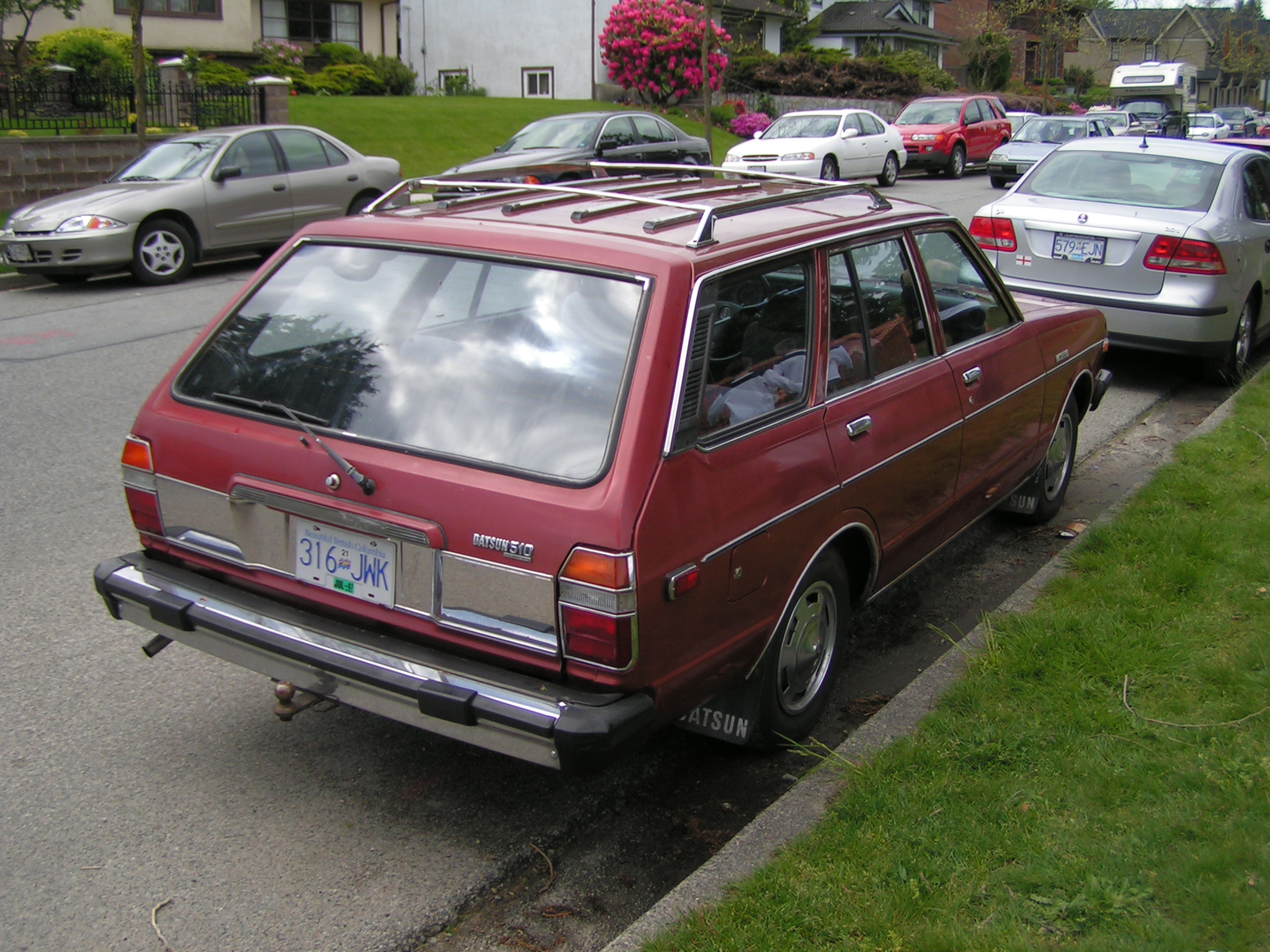
Datsun 510 Wagon (WHLA10, USA)

In the United States and Canada the Violet was sold as the Datsun 510, to cash in on the popularity of the earlier 510 Bluebird. It was available as a two-door sedan, a three-door hatchback, a four-door sedan, a five-door hatchback, or a five-door wagon. It was powered by the 2.0 L inline-four L20B engine, although in 1980 US-spec. cars received the Z20S NAPS-Z inline-four of the same displacement. For the 1980 and 1981 model years, this was the only engine available to the 510. Power is 92 hp (69 kW; 93 PS) at 5,200 rpm. The four-speed manual was standard in the A10 models while the FS5W63A five-speed manual or 3N71B three-speed automatic were available as optional upgrades.

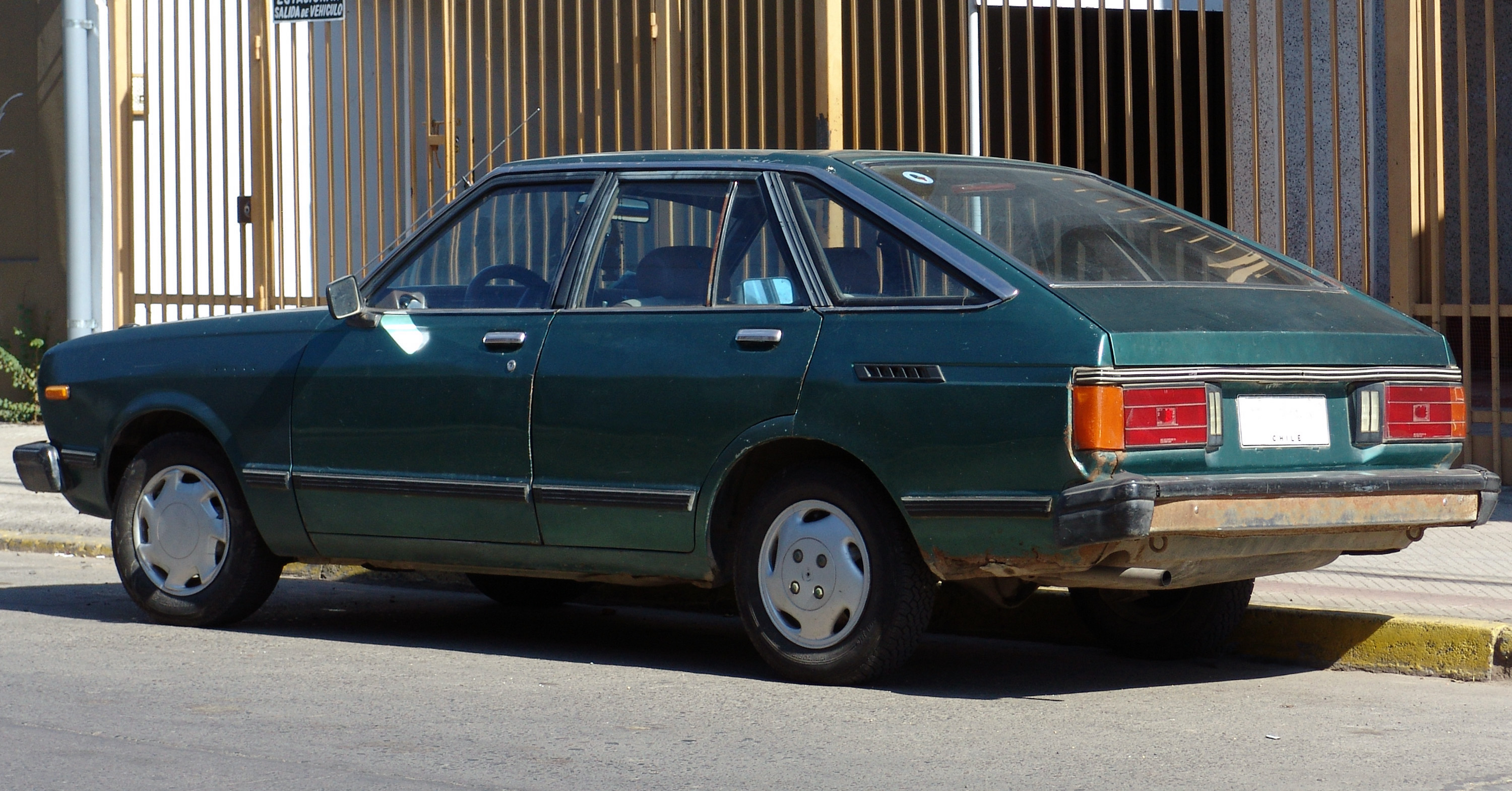
1981 Datsun 160J in the short-lived five-door liftback bodystyle

==== South Africa ====
South African-made Violets were sold as the 1600J or 1800J depending on engine fitment between 1978 and 1980. Four-door saloon or station wagon bodywork was available, with the 1800 sedan also available as a sporting SSS model.

=== Motorsports ===
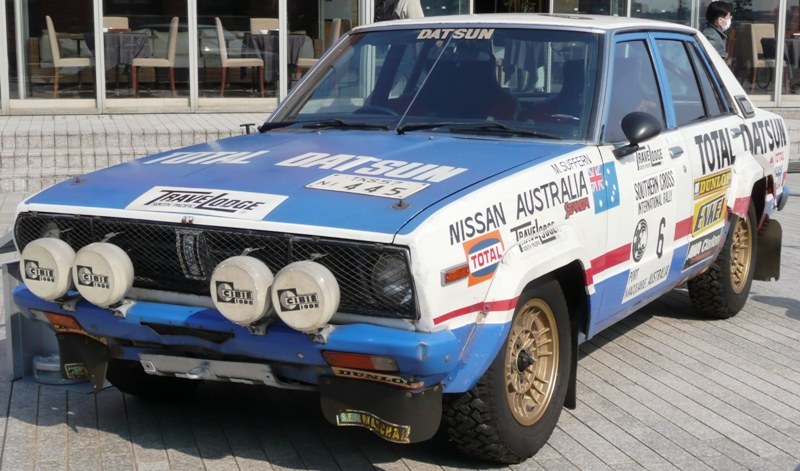
Nissan Violet "Southern Cross" rally car (A10)

The Violet 160J was Nissan's most successful car in the World Rally Championship. It won the Safari Rally in Kenya from 1979 to 1982 consecutively, all with Shekhar Mehta behind the wheel. The 1979 and 1980 winners were powered by an SOHC engine; the 1981 and 1982 winners were Violet GT models with a DOHC engine. These Safari records are only matched by the Toyota Celica GT-Four which won the 1992–95 events. Driven by Timo Salonen, the Violet also won the 1980 Rally New Zealand and the 1981 Rallye Côte d'Ivoire. In 1982 Nissan homologated the Nissan Silvia coupé as a bodystyle variant of the Violet, under the name Nissan Violet GTS, which can cause confusion between the competition histories of these two cars.

==== WRC victories ====
No.	Event	Season	Driver	Co-driver	Car
1	(Kenya) 27th Safari Rally	1979	(Kenya) Shekhar Mehta	(Kenya) Mike Doughty	Datsun 160J
2	(Kenya) 28th Safari Rally	1980	(Kenya) Shekhar Mehta	(Kenya) Mike Doughty	Datsun 160J
3	11th Motogard Rally of New Zealand	1980	(Finland) Timo Salonen	(Finland) Seppo Harjanne	Datsun 160J
4	(Kenya) 29th Safari Rally	1981	(Kenya) Shekhar Mehta	(Kenya) Mike Doughty	Datsun Violet GT
5	(Ivory Coast) 13ème Rallye Côte d'Ivoire	1981	(Finland) Timo Salonen	(Finland) Seppo Harjanne	Datsun Violet GT
6	(Kenya) 30th Marlboro Safari Rally	1982	(Kenya) Shekhar Mehta	(Kenya) Mike Doughty	Datsun Violet GT

== T11 series (1981–1986) ==
Third generation
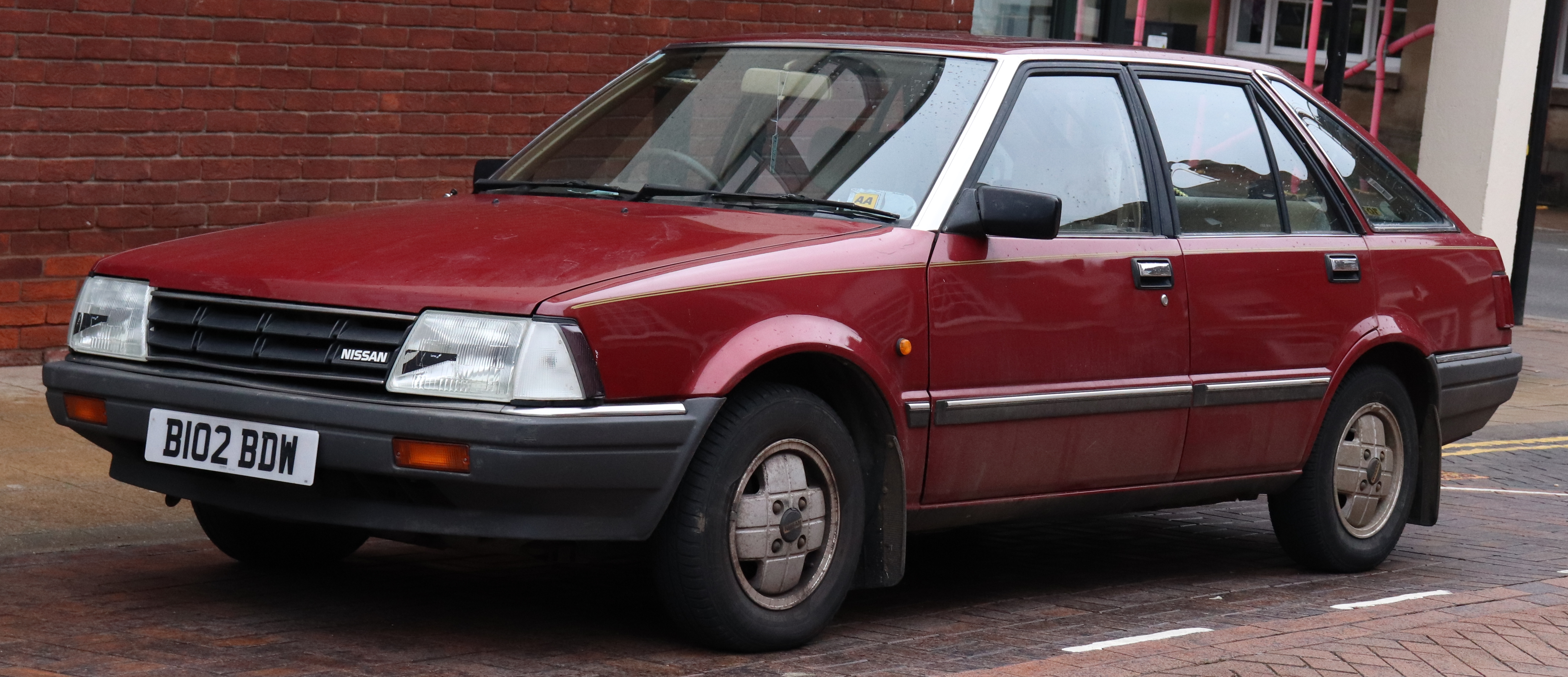
- 1984 Nissan Stanza 1.8 SGL (UK)

Overview
- Model code: T11
- Also called: Nissan Auster; Nissan Violet Liberta; Nissan Stanza
- Production: 1982–1986

Body and chassis
- Body style: 3-door hatchback (Auster); 4-door saloon 5-door hatchback
- Layout: FF layout
- Related: Yue Loong Feeling 101/102, TW

Powertrain
- Engine: 1598 cc CA16S I4; 1809 cc CA18DE I4; 1952 cc Z20E I4; 1974 cc CA20E I4; 1680 cc CD17T TD I4
- Transmission: 3-speed automatic 5-speed manual

Dimensions
- Wheelbase: 2,470 mm (97.2 in)
- Length: 4,300–4,405 mm (169.3–173.4 in)
- Width: 1,665 mm (65.6 in)
- Height: 1,385 mm (54.5 in)
- Curb weight: 970 kg (2,140 lb)

A front-wheel drive Stanza was introduced in 1981 – the first middle-class Datsun to be of that configuration, and the first Japanese car in the category built to the principles which had been established in Europe for this class since a few years back. In Europe, front-wheel drive and a liftback design were becoming the norm in this segment, although more traditional Japanese buyers still preferred the rear-wheel drive Bluebird. It remained on sale in Britain until 1986, after which Nissan sold the first British-built Bluebird as its only product in this market sector. Nissan was previously building a smaller, front wheel drive car, beginning with the 1970 Nissan Cherry, and then reconfigured the Violet to front wheel drive. 3-door hatchback, 4-door saloon, and 5-door liftback models were produced.

After 1982, Nissan tried to standardize the Stanza name in its export markets – in addition to phasing out the Datsun marque in favor of Nissan. In the United States the T11 Stanza with the CA20S engine replaced the 510 for the 1982 model year. In the United States, the Nissan Prairie was also sold as part of the range, renamed the Stanza Wagon. In 1984, Nissan changed the engine in the Stanza from the carbureted CA20S to the fuel-injected 2.0 L, straight-four CA20E. This car was 1981 Semperit Irish Car of the Year in Ireland. Japanese and some other export models were called "Stanza FX", and were offered with 1.6 and 1.8 L engines.

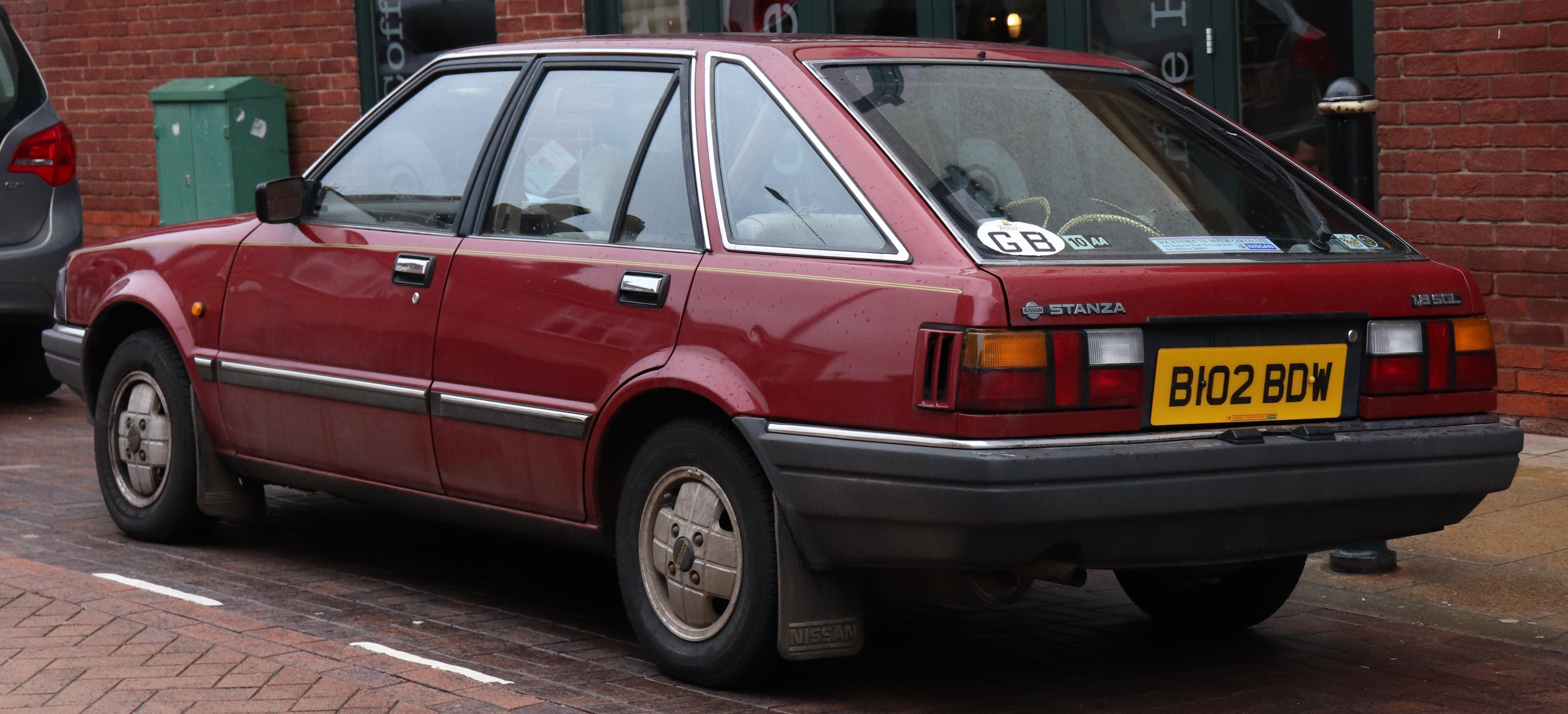
Nissan Stanza 1.8 SGL Liftback (United Kingdom)

This version was sold in the United Kingdom and Europe as the Nissan Stanza; the range was "L" 1.6 L, "GL" 1.6 L, "SGL" 1.6 L and "SGL" 1.8 L. Some markets (such as Belgium, where it came fitted with the full SGL equipment) also received a 1.7-litre turbodiesel engine with 73 PS (54 kW), beginning with the 1984 model year. European market cars were generally fitted with very long gearing, making the car one of the most fuel economic in its class. It was first sold in Britain from January 1982, alongside the similar-sized rear-wheel drive Bluebird saloons and estates, which later also switched to front-wheel drive. This meant that Nissan was in the position of offering traditional rear-wheel drive saloons and estates alongside similar-sized front-wheel drive cars including hatchbacks, as this market sector was in a period of transition in the early 1980s.

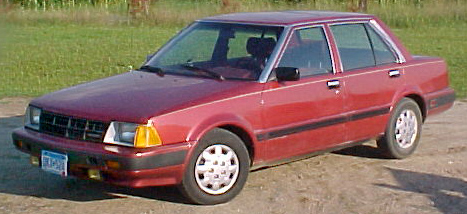
1983 pre-facelift Nissan Stanza sedan (US)

Nissan-Datsun New Zealand occasionally imported later generation Violets and other models for evaluation, or imported a small production run if additional import licences became available (there was a trading scheme enabling importers to trade unused annual license allocations with each other). One highly specified, five-door, third generation, front-drive model with automatic transmission - and then-rare air conditioning - was imported for an international distributors' conference held in NZ in 1981 and was later used by a company executive's wife before being resold through the company's own dealer network. There was also a small later shipment of cars for public sale (this time without a/c) but, as usual with low-volume imports of this type by Nissan and rivals, most were presold before the ship docked. A number of Stanzas also arrived as used imports from Japan in the late 1980s.

In Indonesia, the T11 Stanza 1.6 L was a popular car taxi in the mid-1980s.

The facelifted Japanese models have an upright nose, similar to that of the Bluebird U11 series. The Stanza was available in Japan at Nissan Satio Store locations, while its badge engineered companion was sold as the Japanese: Violet Liberta five-door hatchback from 1981-1982, then replaced by the smaller Pulsar based Japanese: Liberta Villa three-door hatchback. The Violet Liberta was sold at Nissan Cherry Store locations but only as a five door hatchback.

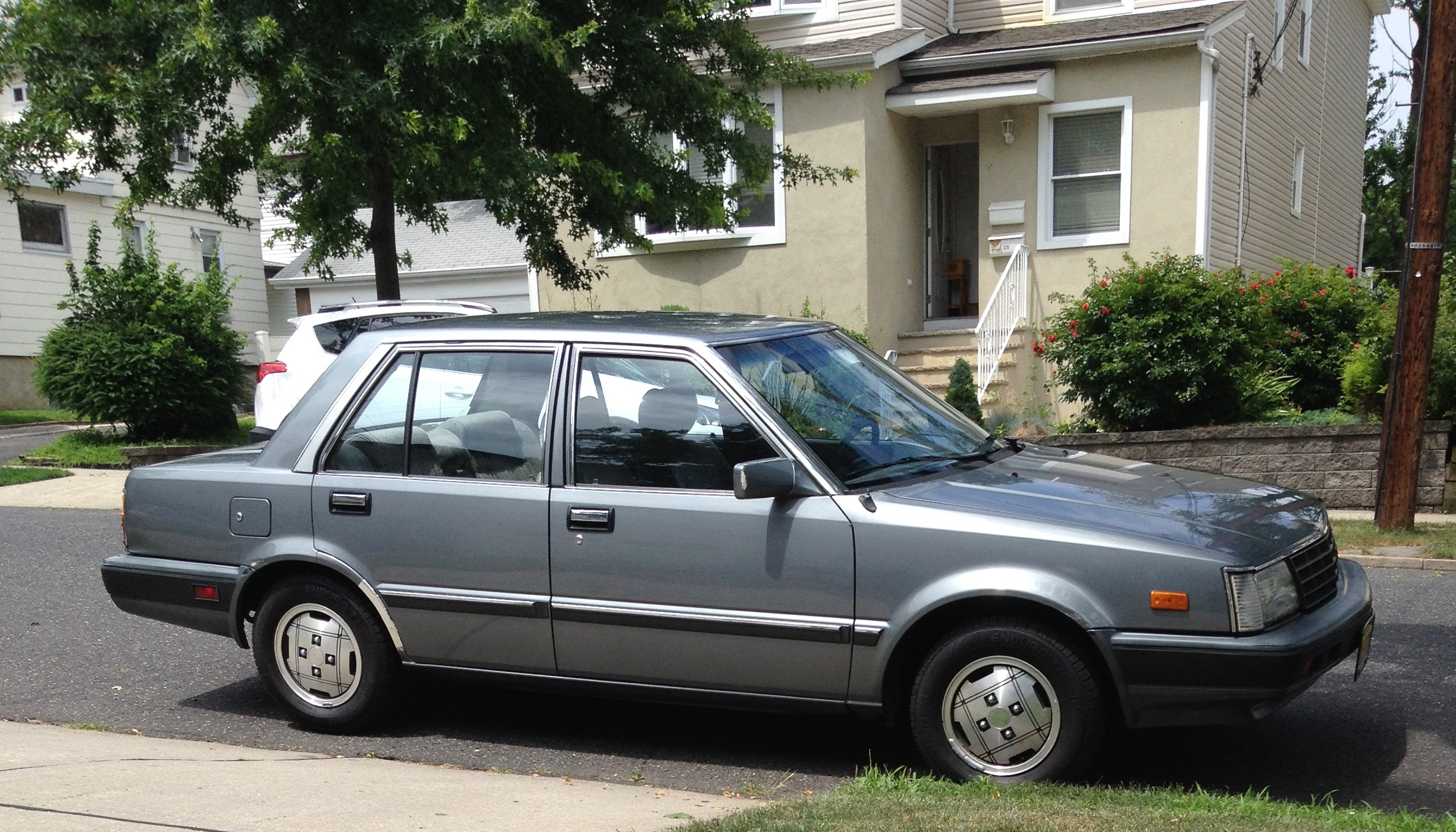
1985 facelift Nissan Stanza GL in the US.

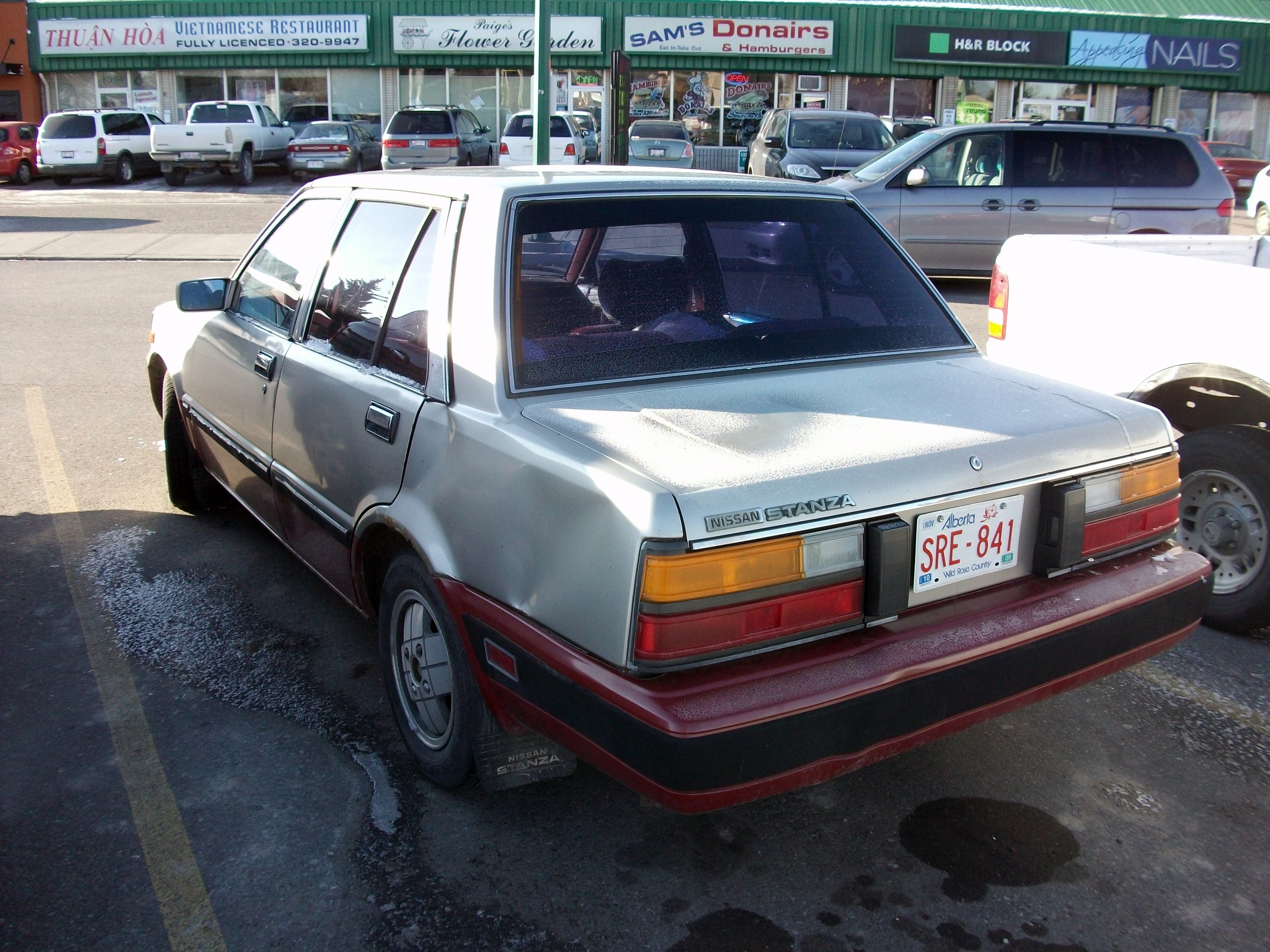
1985 facelift Nissan Stanza GL in the US.

The Auster was a higher specification and sportier version of the Stanza for the Japanese domestic market, with the emphasis towards a younger demographic. The three-door hatchback Auster GT-ES was equipped with a five-speed manual transmission. Various trim packages were labeled, 1600 CS-X, Auster JX, GS-X Extra, and the 1800 GS-L Super Saloon. The Auster was exclusive to Nissan Prince Store locations, as a lower cost alternative to the Skyline, but was slightly larger than the Nissan Langley.

The Stanza T11 series was the only time in the US market that a Nissan was rated more-reliable than the Toyota Camry, between 1983 and 1986, according to 1983-1986 Consumer Reports magazine. In early years, Toyota had major problems with the Camry's mufflers. Since 1987, Nissan have again fallen behind to Toyota and Honda in reliability.

The Stanza nameplate was discontinued in Europe after the 1986 model year, and rebadged as a "Bluebird."

Derivatives

In Taiwan a car closely based on the T11 Nissan Stanza got the name Yue Loong Feeling 101 and in a facelifted version Yue Loong Feeling 102. Both were available as a sedan and in a hatchback variant. The vehicles later got an aggressive redesign with angled headlights and more sporty rearlamps. These versions were the first indigenously developed Taiwanese cars and were even exported in small numbers.

== T12 series (1986–1990) ==
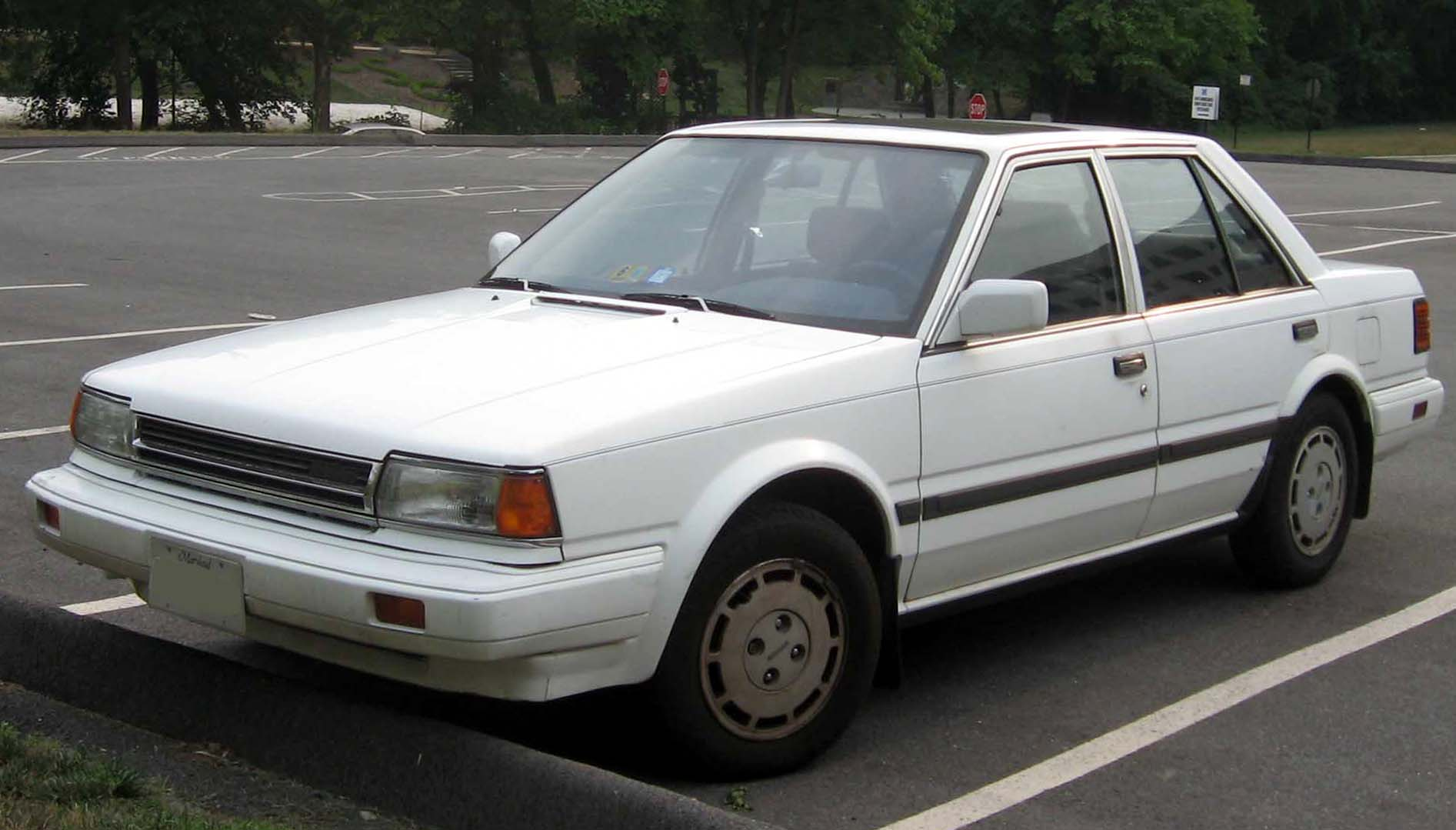
- 1987-1989 Nissan Stanza GXE (US)

Overview
- Also called: Nissan Auster; Nissan Bluebird; Nissan Liberta (Middle East); Nissan Maxima (Philippines)
- Production: 1986–1990

Body and chassis
- Body style: 4-door saloon 5-door hatchback
- Layout: FF layout
- Related: Nissan Prairie/Axxess; Nissan Bluebird U11

Powertrain
- Engine: 1.6 L CA16S I4; 1.8 L CA18i/CA18DE I4; 1.8 L CA18ET turbo I4; 1.8 L CA18DET DOHC turbo I4; 2.0 L CA20S/CA20E I4; 2.0 L LD20 diesel I4
- Transmission: 4-speed manual; 5-speed manual; 4-speed automatic

Dimensions
- Wheelbase: 2,550 mm (100.4 in)
- Length: 4,516 mm (177.8 in)
- Width: 1,689 mm (66.5 in)
- Height: 1,389 mm (54.7 in)
- Curb weight: 1,220 kg (2,690 lb)

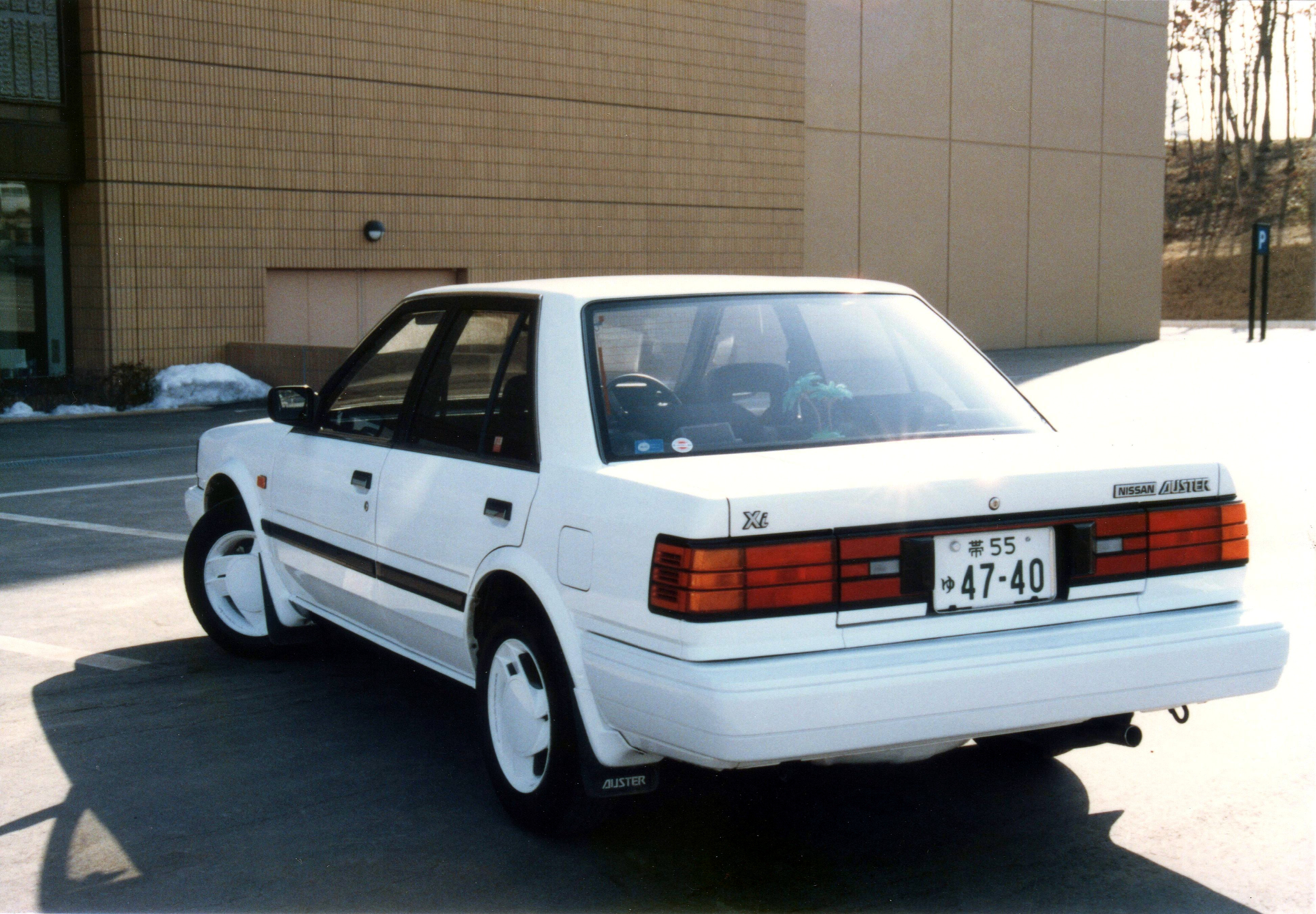
Nissan Auster Xi (T12, Japan)

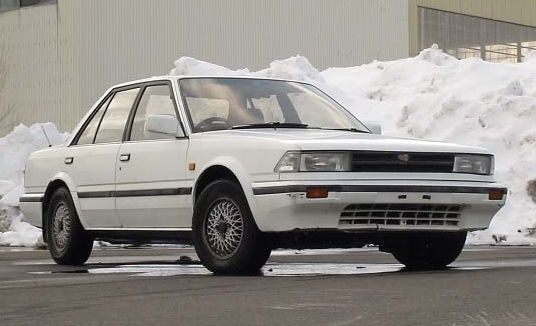
The facelift Japanese Nissan Stanza (T12)

Nissan renewed the Auster and Stanza lines in 1986 (T12 series), introducing squared-off styling. Japan and the US received this model. The US Stanza used the same CA20E engine found in the previous generation. The car was unusually heavy for its class, due to sharing a platform with the contemporary Maxima and as a result of its small engine, underpowered. In markets outside of North America, Nissan also offered turbocharged models, badged "Bluebird GTi" in Europe and "Stanza Supremo" in Japan; the sister model was called the "Auster XTT".

Europe received a version of the Nissan Auster as a Datsun/Nissan Bluebird replacement. These were built in Sunderland, in the United Kingdom, and badged as the Nissan Bluebird. The estate was the only "real" Bluebird in this range, imported from Japan.

In the Middle East, the T12 Auster/Stanza T12 was called the Nissan Liberta (not to be confused with the Nissan Liberta Villa), a partial replacement of the Nissan Liberta Violet T11.

The Stanza line was not seen in most other export markets after the 1986 model year. The growth of the Sunny and Pulsar models from below meant there was little room for it.

=== Bluebird (Europe) ===
The T12 was introduced in Europe in 1985 as a replacement for the U11 Bluebird. From July 1986, the T12 was imported as a knock-down kit from Japan and assembled at Nissan Motor Manufacturing UK. The saloon versions (four door) were available first and the hatchback (five door) became available in January 1987. Using the U11 platform, Bluebird Estates were still sourced from Japan. Although it was not the first Japanese car to be built in Britain (the Honda-based Triumph Acclaim predated it by five years), the Bluebird was instrumental in proving that a British factory could produce vehicles to the same quality standards as those built in Japan. As the earliest cars from the plant were assembled in kit form, they still counted as Japanese production and therefore formed part of Nissan's import quota. It was not until early 1988 that the amount of UK-sourced content in Sunderland-built Bluebirds exceeded the sixty percent threshold and they were legally considered "British", immune from import restrictions.

The Bluebird proved so popular that in December 1987 Nissan announced the institution of a third shift, in order to bump production from 29,000 to circa 40,000 cars annually. Being built in the United Kingdom, it was possible to sell the Bluebird in markets like Spain and Italy without the quota limitations imposed on Japanese-made cars and by October 1988 they were available in nine European markets. In Italy, it was the only Nissan available in 1989, alongside the Spanish-made Patrol off-roader.

The later T72 models replaced the T12 during 1987, followed by a facelift around a year later. The facelift models had a more modern and European look, with round front and rear bumpers and the corporate slatted grille. These were eventually built entirely in England. In 1990, Nissan replaced the Bluebird with the Primera.

Almost all petrol T12/T72 Bluebirds came with 8-valve versions of Nissan's CA Engine and either a five-speed manual or a four-speed automatic transmission. The diesel models used the normally aspirated LD20 engine. Performance was average for its class, the 1.6 struggling more with its lower torque characteristics that did not seem suited to the weight of the car. The turbo models used the CA18ET engine with 135 PS (99 kW; 133 bhp) giving a 0 – 60 mph (97 km/h) time of 8.6 seconds. This engine used a small turbocharger producing 0.60 bar of boost. This is the same engine used in the European Nissan Silvia S12. Power outputs for the naturally aspirated engines ranged from 84 to 116 PS (62 to 85 kW; 83 to 114 hp) from the 1.6 through the 2.0-litre version, while the diesel offered 67 PS (49 kW; 66 hp).

As part of the 2016 celebrations marking Nissan’s 30th anniversary of production in the United Kingdom, a group of T12 and T72 owners traveled to Nissan Motor Manufacturing UK. The members of the Bluebird Car Club got to meet the employees who built their cars and view the firm's modern manufacturing operations first-hand.

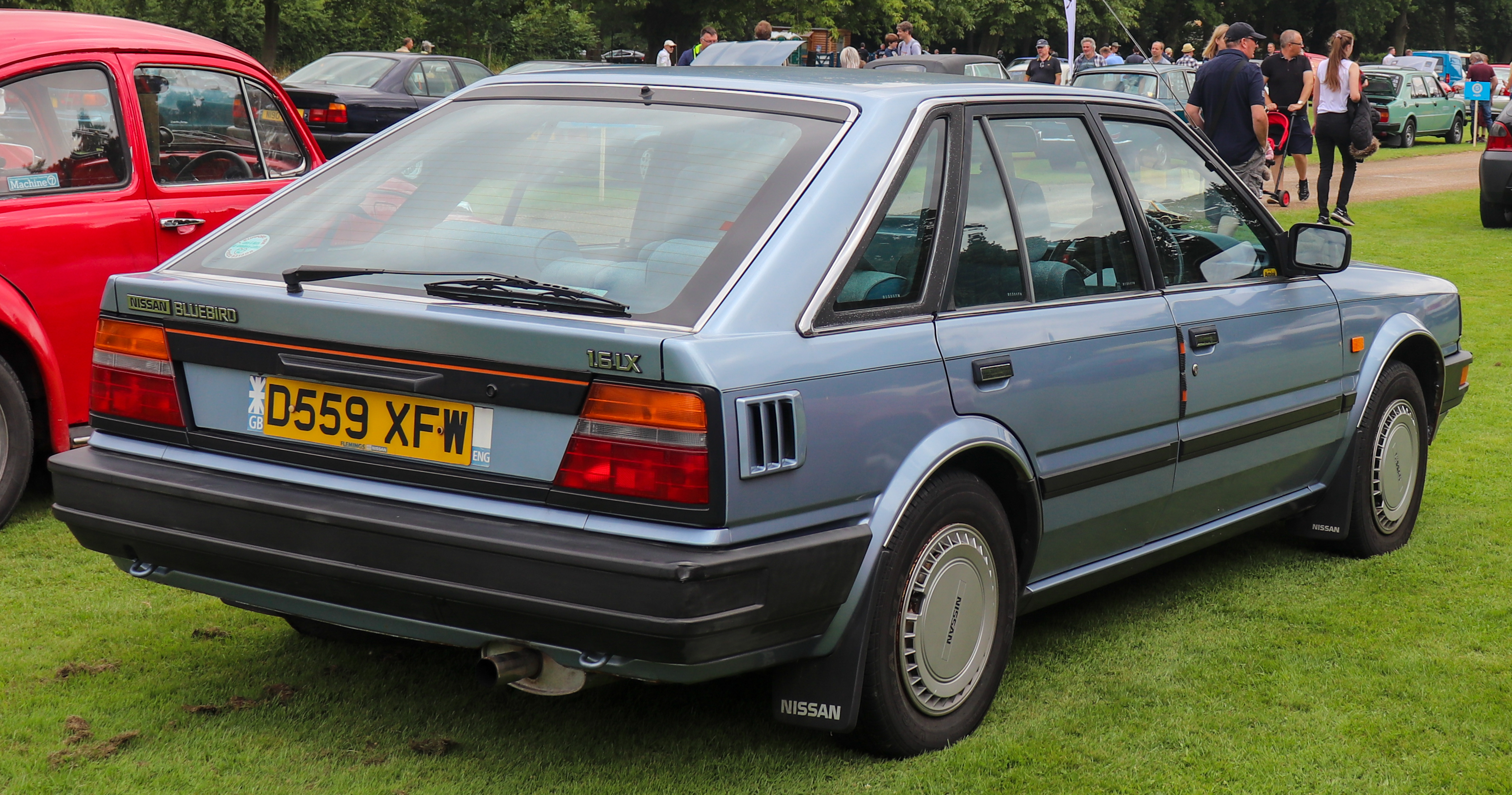
1987 Nissan Bluebird 1.6 LX hatchback

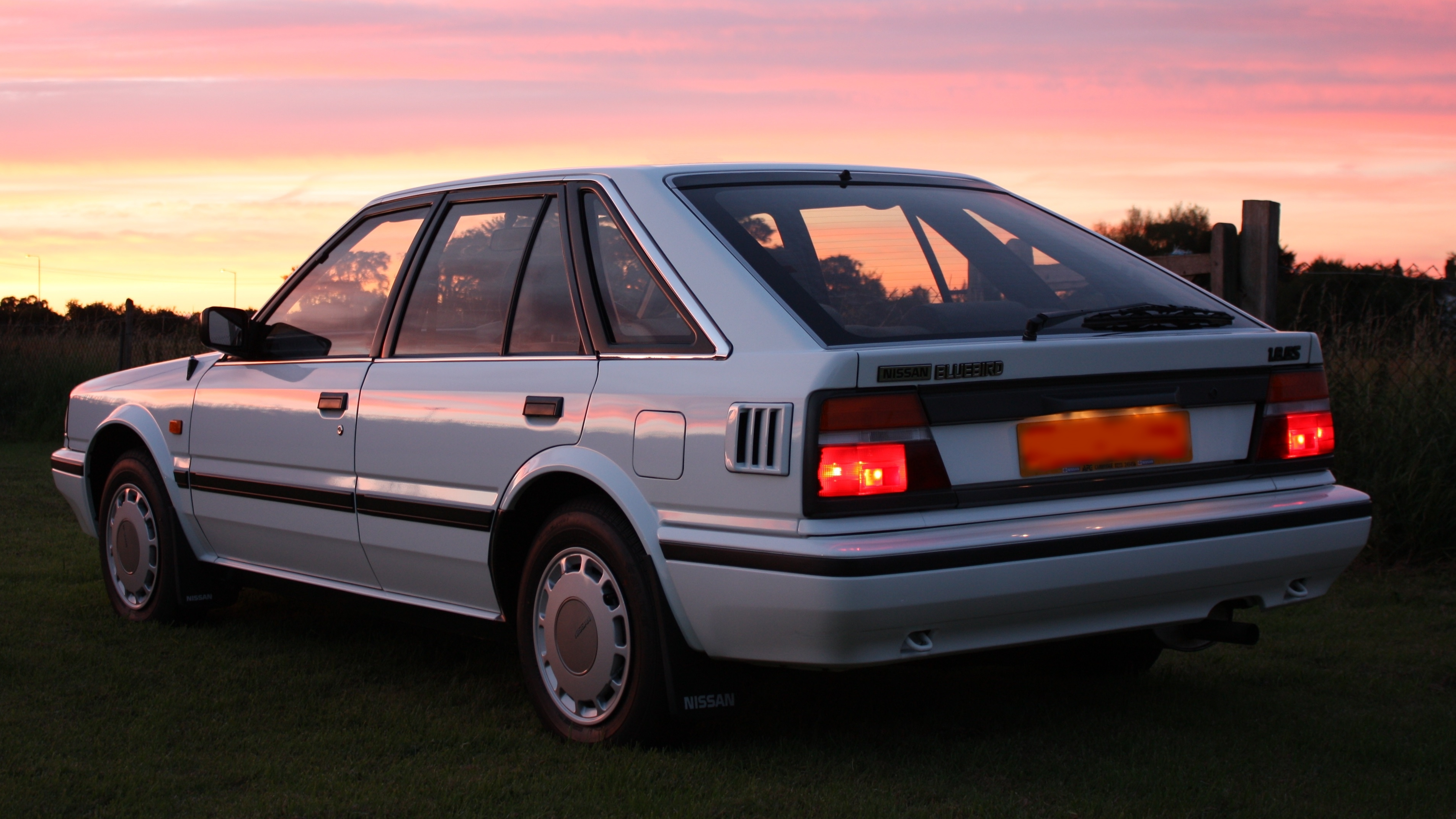
1989 Nissan Bluebird 1.8 GS Hatchback

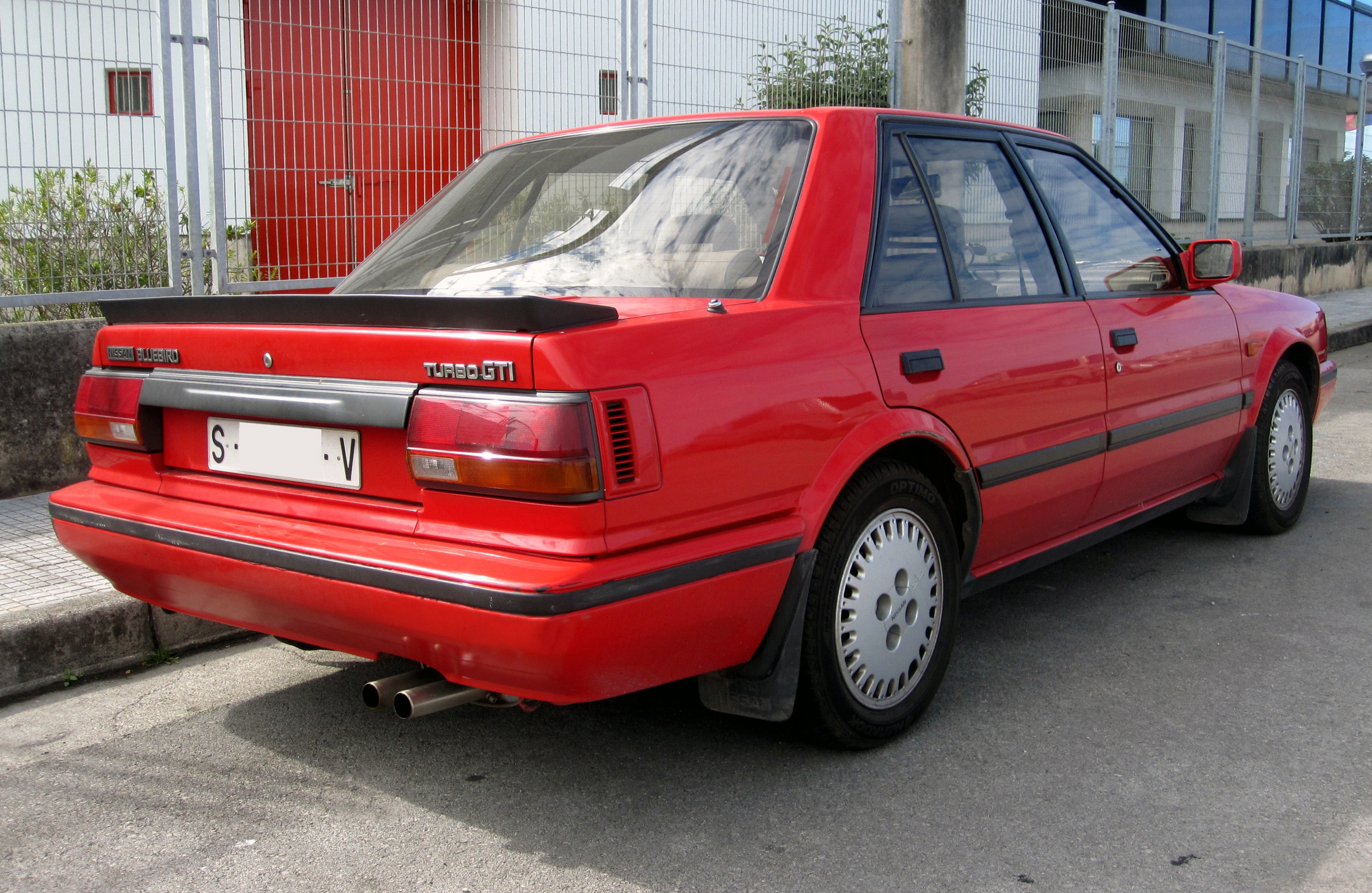
1990 Nissan Bluebird Turbo GTI

Nissan Auster (T12)

== U12 series (1989–1992) ==
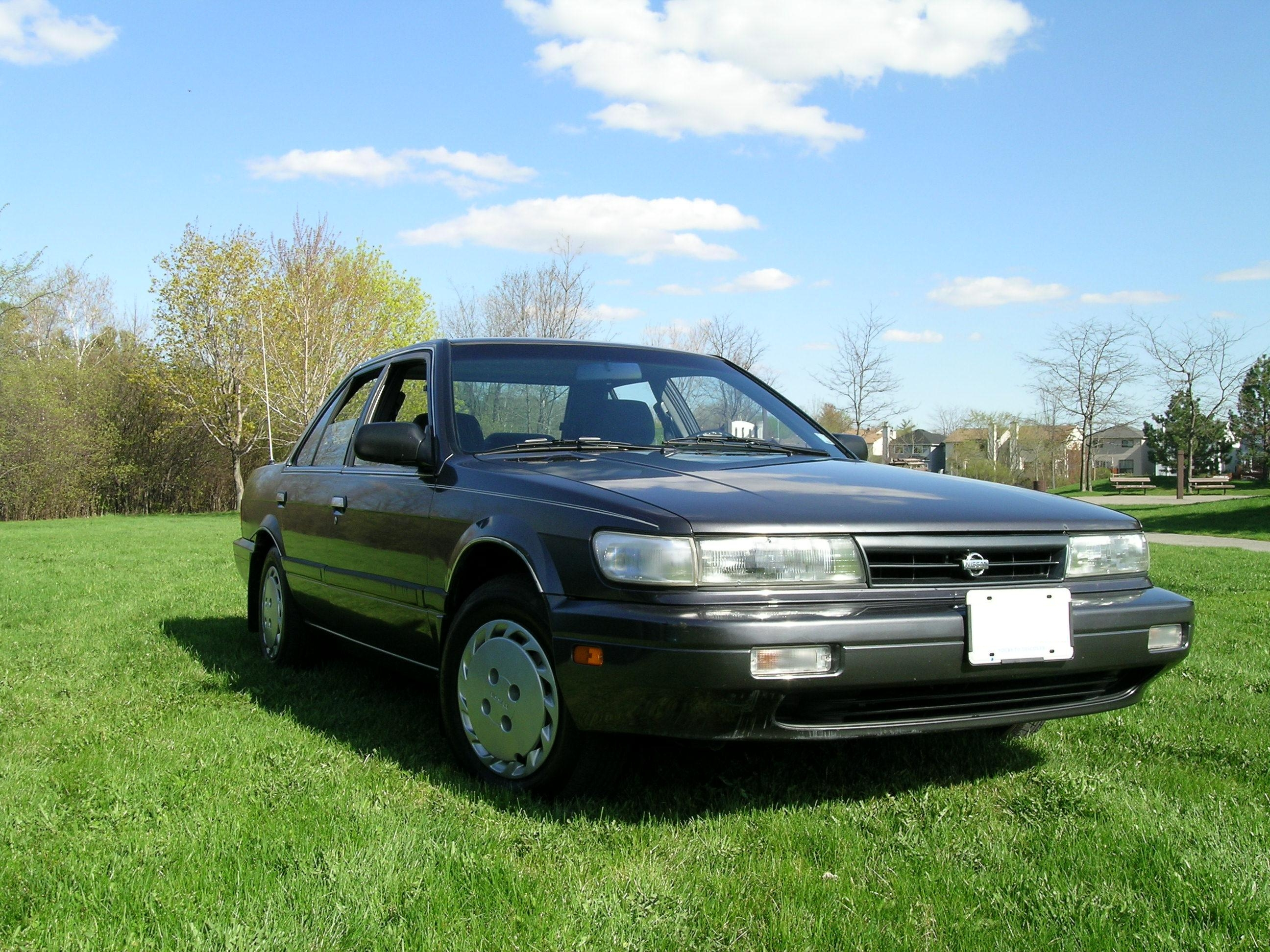
- 1991 Nissan Stanza XE (U12)

Overview
- Also called: Nissan Bluebird (U12); Nissan Pintara (U12); Yue Loong Bluebird 941 (Yulon, TW)
- Production: 1989–1992

Body and chassis
- Body style: 4-door saloon
- Layout: FF layout

Powertrain
- Engine: 2.4 L KA24E I4
- Transmission: 4-speed automatic 5-speed manual

Dimensions
- Wheelbase: 100.4 in (2,550 mm)
- Length: 1990–91: 4,569 mm (179.9 in); 1992: 4,590 mm (180.7 in)
- Width: 1,699 mm (66.9 in)
- Height: 1,374 mm (54.1 in)
- Curb weight: 1,265 kg (2,789 lb)

Chronology
- Successor: Nissan Altima (North America)

For the 1990 model year, the American version of the Stanza was replaced by a basic version of the Nissan Bluebird (U12), wearing Stanza badges. In Japan, the Stanza was replaced by the Nissan Cefiro while the Auster was replaced by the Nissan Primera also in 1990.

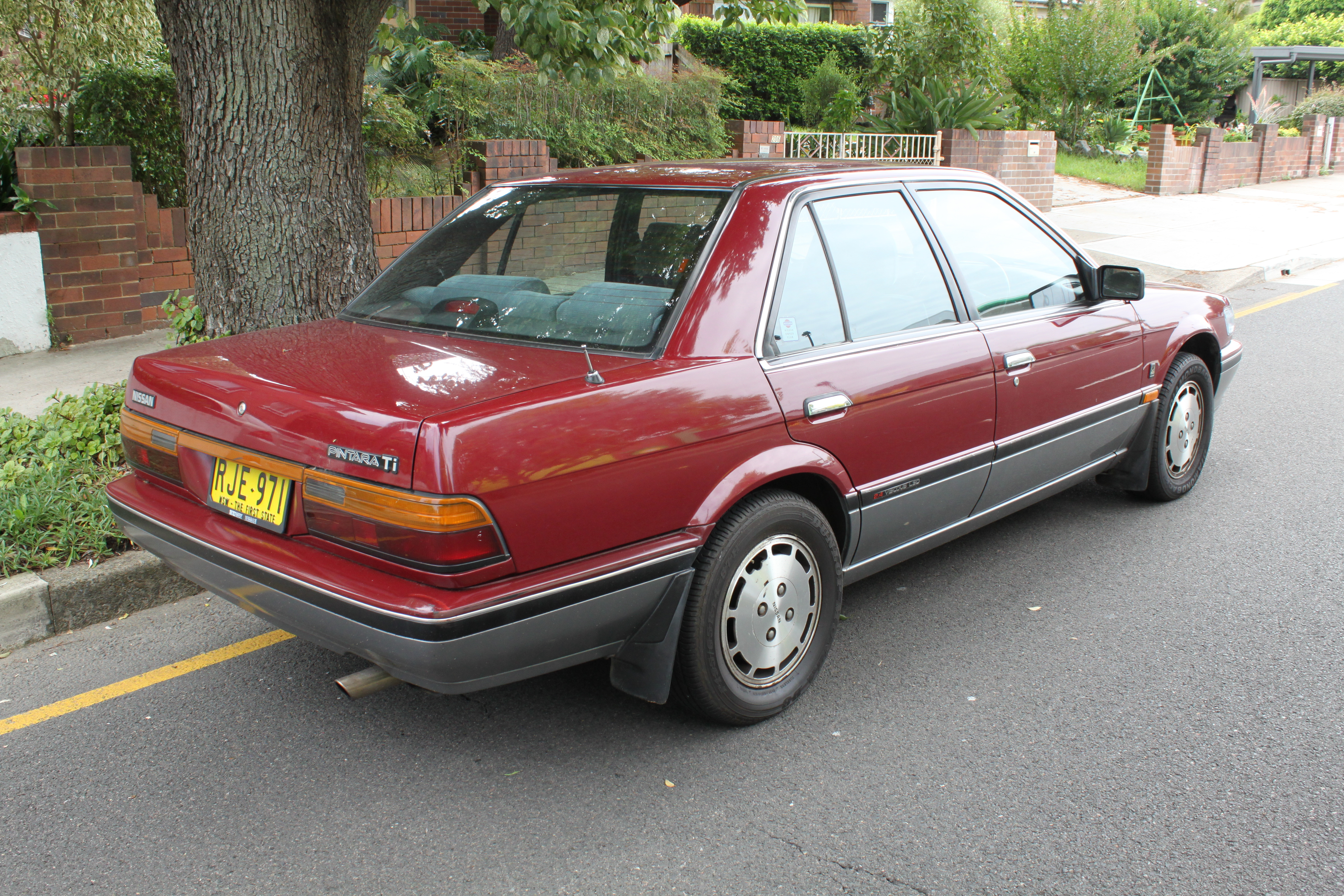
Nissan Pintara Ti sedan (U12) in Australia

The JDM Bluebird has the rear license plate higher between the tail lights, whereas the Stanza's is mounted on the bumper. In Australia, this generation is called Pintara, and it's similar to the JDM model.

The fourth generation was offered in North America in two trim levels, "XE" and "GXE", with a sportier SE trim added for 1992. The 4th Gen used the 2.4 L inline-4 Nissan KA24E engine, an upgrade from previous generations in displacement (from 1974 cc to 2398 cc), power (from 94 hp (70 kW) to 138 hp (103 kW)), and torque (from 114 lb⋅ft (155 N⋅m) to 148 lb⋅ft (201 N⋅m)). The KA engine was not used on Japanese-spec Bluebirds.

The fourth generation had EPA estimated fuel economy of 18 mpg_{‑US} (13 L/100 km; 22 mpg_{‑imp}) city and 25 mpg_{‑US} (9.4 L/100 km; 30 mpg_{‑imp}) highway for the 4-speed automatic transmission. For the 5-speed manual transmission the Stanza has EPA estimated fuel economy of 18 mpg_{‑US} (13 L/100 km; 22 mpg_{‑imp}) city and 26 mpg_{‑US} (9.0 L/100 km; 31 mpg_{‑imp}) highway.

The Stanza was discontinued after the 1992 model year, superseded by the American-built, Bluebird-based Altima. The last American Stanza was assembled on 27 March 1992, its nameplate used on in the first generation Altima, which was marketed as the "Nissan Stanza Altima".
