= Feedbooks =

Defunct French digital library and cloud publishing service

- Website type: Digital library
- Available in: English, French
- Owners: Hadrien Gardeur; Loïc Roussel; David Julien
- Website: www.feedbooks.com
- Commercial: Yes
- Registration: Required for buying books
- Launched: June 2007; 19 years ago
- Current status: Defunct

Feedbooks was a digital library and cloud publishing service for both public domain and original books founded in June 2007 and based in Paris, France. The main focus of the web site is providing e-books with particularly high-quality typesetting in multiple formats, particularly EPUB, Kindle, and PDF formats.

The website announced in 2024 that it will be shut down and replaced by Cantook. As of July 23, 2024, the domain feedbooks.com redirects to Cantook.com.

== Features ==
Custom PDF generation settings, like trim size dimensions and margins, are possible on the site. Feedbooks offers over 80,000 ebooks. As of 2011, Feedbooks distributed around 3 million ebooks every month.

Books can be discovered and accessed by any client using the OPDS standard. Self-published books are edited using a web interface; they are also accessible via dedicated Kindle and mobile websites. The interface also supports creating footnotes.

== See also ==
- Internet Archive
- Project Gutenberg
