= Open Publication Distribution System =

Web syndication format

- Internet media type: application/opds+json
- Initial release: 5 May 2010
- Latest release: OPDS 2.0; 18 May 2026; 5 months ago
- Type of format: web syndication
- Extended from: JSON-LD 1.1
- Open format?: Yes
- Website: opds.io

The Open Publication Distribution System (OPDS) catalog format is a syndication format for electronic publications based on the Readium Web Publication model and JSON-LD. OPDS catalogs enable the aggregation, distribution, discovery, and acquisition of electronic publications, with or without digital rights management through Readium LCP. OPDS catalogs use existing or emergent open standards and conventions, with a priority on simplicity.

The Open Publication Distribution System specification is prepared by an informal grouping of partners, combining Internet Archive, O'Reilly Media, Feedbooks, OLPC, and others.

== History ==
OPDS is based on the initial work done by Lexcycle, the company behind Stanza, an eBook reader application for iOS. All revisions of the specification were produced by an informal group organized around an open mailing list.

After being in a stable draft state since 2017, the latest version, OPDS 2.0, became the official latest stable version in May 2026 as a living standard that will evolve with the needs of the community.

Version history
Version	Date
0.9	May 25, 2010
1.0	August 30, 2010
1.1	June 27, 2011
1.2	November 11, 2018
2.0	May 18, 2026
Supported Latest version

== OPDS software ==
Many e-readers or e-book reading applications support importing books from an OPDS catalog. E-book management applications such as Calibre also often include OPDS server software to make an e-book collection available through an OPDS catalog.

The OPDS community maintains a list of clients and servers implementing OPDS.

== Example of OPDS 2.0 content ==
Excerpt from the OPDS test catalog.

{
  "metadata": { "title": "OPDS 2.0 Test Catalog" },
  "links": [
    {
      "rel": "self",
      "href": "https://test.opds.io/2.0/home.json",
      "type": "application/opds+json"
    }
  ],
  "navigation": [
    {
      "href": "https://test.opds.io/2.0/navigation.json",
      "title": "Explore (Navigation Feed)",
      "type": "application/opds+json"
    },
    {
      "href": "https://test.opds.io/2.0/publications.json",
      "title": "French Books (Publications Feed)",
      "type": "application/opds+json"
    }
  ],
  "groups": [
    {
      "metadata": { "title": "French Classics", "numberOfItems": 5 },
      "links": [
        {
          "rel": "self",
          "href": "https://test.opds.io/2.0/publications.json",
          "type": "application/opds+json"
        }
      ],
      "publications": [
        {
          "metadata": {
            "@type": "http://schema.org/Book",
            "title": "Voyage au centre de la Terre",
            "author": { "name": "Jules Verne", "sortAs": "Verne, Jules" },
            "identifier": "http://fr.feedbooks.com/book/1474/voyage-au-centre-de-la-terre",
            "language": "fr",
            "modified": "2018-04-23T22:15:00Z",
            "published": "1864-01-01",
            "publisher": "Feedbooks",
            "numberOfPages": 251,
            "subject": [
              { "name": "Science Fiction", "code": "FBFIC028000" },
              { "name": "Action & Aventure", "code": "FBFIC002000" }
            ],
            "description": "Le professeur Lidenbrock trouve un document dans lequel il apprend l'existence d'un volcan éteint dont la cheminée pourrait le conduire jusqu'au centre de la Terre. Accompagné de son neveu Axel et du guide Hans, il se rend au volcan Sneffels, en Islande, et s'engouffre dans les entrailles de la Terre. Ils ne tarderont pas à faire d'étonnantes découvertes..."
          },
          "links": [
            {
              "rel": "http://opds-spec.org/acquisition/open-access",
              "href": "https://test.opds.io/assets/centredelaterre/file.epub",
              "type": "application/epub+zip"
            }
          ],
          "images": [
            {
              "href": "https://test.opds.io/assets/centredelaterre/small.jpg",
              "type": "image/jpeg",
              "height": 110,
              "width": 146
            },
            {
              "href": "https://test.opds.io/assets/centredelaterre/normal.jpg",
              "type": "image/jpeg",
              "height": 346,
              "width": 260
            }
          ]
        }
      ]
    }
  ]
}

== Example of OPDS 1.1 content ==
An example of an acquisition feed in OPDS 1.1:

<?xml version="1.0" encoding="UTF-8"?>
<feed xmlns="http://www.w3.org/2005/Atom"
      xmlns:dc="http://purl.org/dc/terms/"
      xmlns:opds="http://opds-spec.org/2010/catalog">
  <id>urn:uuid:433a5d6a-0b8c-4933-af65-4ca4f02763eb</id>
 
  <link rel="related" 
        href="/opds-catalogs/vampire.farming.xml" 
        type="application/atom+xml;profile=opds-catalog;kind=acquisition"/>
  <link rel="self"    
        href="/opds-catalogs/unpopular.xml"
        type="application/atom+xml;profile=opds-catalog;kind=acquisition"/>
  <link rel="start"   
        href="/opds-catalogs/root.xml"
        type="application/atom+xml;profile=opds-catalog;kind=navigation"/>
  <link rel="up"      
        href="/opds-catalogs/root.xml"
        type="application/atom+xml;profile=opds-catalog;kind=navigation"/>
 
  <title>Unpopular Publications</title>
  <updated>2010-01-10T10:01:11Z</updated>
  <author>
    <name>Spec Writer</name>
    <uri>http://opds-spec.org</uri>
  </author>
 
  <entry>
    <title>Bob, Son of Bob</title>
    <id>urn:uuid:6409a00b-7bf2-405e-826c-3fdff0fd0734</id>
    <updated>2010-01-10T10:01:11Z</updated>
    <author>
      <name>Bob the Recursive</name>
      <uri>http://opds-spec.org/authors/1285</uri>
    </author>
    <dc:language>en</dc:language>
    <dc:issued>1917</dc:issued>
    <category scheme="http://www.bisg.org/standards/bisac_subject/index.html"
              term="FIC020000"
              label="FICTION / Men's Adventure"/>
    <summary>The story of the son of the Bob and the gallant part he played in
      the lives of a man and a woman.</summary>

    <link rel="http://opds-spec.org/image"     
          href="/covers/4561.lrg.png"
          type="image/png"/> 
    <link rel="http://opds-spec.org/image/thumbnail" 
          href="/covers/4561.thmb.gif"
          type="image/gif"/>
 
    <link rel="alternate"
          href="/opds-catalogs/entries/4571.complete.xml"
          type="application/atom+xml;type=entry;profile=opds-catalog" 
          title="Complete Catalog Entry for Bob, Son of Bob"/>
 
    <link rel="http://opds-spec.org/acquisition" 
          href="/content/free/4561.epub"
          type="application/epub+zip"/>
    <link rel="http://opds-spec.org/acquisition" 
          href="/content/free/4561.mobi"
          type="application/x-mobipocket-ebook"/>
  </entry>
 
  <entry>
    <title>Modern Online Philately</title>
    <id>urn:uuid:7b595b0c-e15c-4755-bf9a-b7019f5c1dab</id>
    <author>
      <name>Stampy McGee</name>
      <uri>http://opds-spec.org/authors/21285</uri>
    </author>
    <author>
      <name>Alice McGee</name>
      <uri>http://opds-spec.org/authors/21284</uri>
    </author>
    <author>
      <name>Harold McGee</name>
      <uri>http://opds-spec.org/authors/21283</uri>
    </author>
    <updated>2010-01-10T10:01:10Z</updated>
    <rights>Copyright (c) 2009, Stampy McGee</rights>
    <dc:identifier>urn:isbn:978029536341X</dc:identifier>
    <dc:publisher>StampMeOnline, Inc.</dc:publisher>
    <dc:language>en</dc:language>
    <dc:issued>2009-10-01</dc:issued>
    <content type="text">The definitive reference for the web-curious
      philatelist.</content>

    <link rel="http://opds-spec.org/image"     
          href="/covers/11241.lrg.jpg"
          type="image/jpeg"/> 
 
    <link rel="http://opds-spec.org/acquisition/buy" 
          href="/content/buy/11241.epub"
          type="application/epub+zip">
      <opds:price currencycode="USD">18.99</opds:price>
      <opds:price currencycode="GBP">11.99</opds:price>
    </link>
  </entry>
</feed>

== OPDS catalogs ==
Dozens of OPDS catalogs are available online, and in many different languages.

Many users of OPDS also create their own OPDS catalog, as a way to access their ebooks from any device.

Developers implementing an OPDS catalog usually use the Feedbooks catalog as an example of a fully featured catalog. An OPDS validator is also available to test OPDS feeds.
