= Civac =

Coordinates: 18.912°N 99.169°W

CIVAC (In Spanish: Ciudad Industrial del Valle de Cuernavaca, English: Industrial City of the Cuernavaca Valley) is an industrial park and residential neighborhood located on 230 hectares (2.3 km^{2}) in the municipality of Jiutepec, approximately 10 minutes (by road) east of Cuernavaca, in the state of Morelos, Mexico. The climate in Civac is warm/subtropical with summer showers. It has an average temperature of 21°C, ranging from 0.5°C to 40°C. Its postal code is 62578 and its telephone code is 777. Civac is divided into an industrial zone and a residential zone.

The first factory was Mexama which opened in 1961. On March 4, 1966, The Industrial City was officially established under a mandate from President Gustavo Diaz Ordaz. That same year, Nissan Mexicana built and opened its first ever assembly plant outside Japan.

Civac is considered the most important economic development center of the State of Morelos and it accommodates a considerable number of national and international enterprises such as Roche (formerly Syntex), Unilever, NEC, Baxter International, Alucaps, Givaudan, GlaxoSmithKline, Fibrolub Mexicana, Mycom Mayekawa, along with another 120 companies. Nissan still operates in Civac; it is the largest facility in the industrial park, it has two manufacturing plants on site and employees more than 2000 workers.

PROCIVAC (Asociacion de Propietarios de CIVAC, CIVAC Owners Association) was created in 1972 to manage the operation of public services in the area. However, in 1993 its responsibilities were restricted to the industrial zone only.

PROCIVAC is in charge of water services, trash collection, road maintenance, landscape maintenance, public lighting, signage, and general infrastructure; PROCIVAC also supervises urban projects and offers advice on industrial safety and environmental preservation. Its key areas are: the CCEC (Centro de Control de Emergencias de Civac, Civac Emergency control center), specializing in the prevention, training, and control of industrial emergencies; and the ECCACIV, Latin America's most modern wastewater treatment plant.

Civac residents have easy access to other services like public and private schools (Daycare, pre-school, elementary, middle school and two technological centers), medical facilities, worship temples, parks, banking facilities, shopping areas and a constant and affordable transportation system which connects them to Cuernavaca and Jiutepec metropolitan areas.
