= Bluefire Reader =

- Developer(s): Bluefire Productions
- Stable release: 2.1.0 / June 27, 2016
- Operating system: Android, iOS
- Type: e-book reader
- License: Proprietary
- Website: www.bluefirereader.com/bluefire-reader.html

Bluefire Reader is an e-book reader application for Android (superseded by Cloudshelf Reader), iOS and Windows operating systems that supports white-labelling. It supports the EPUB and PDF formats for digital publications and incorporates facilities for browsing online catalogs, and downloading them directly into the user's personal library. The application features a library that lets users navigate their collection of eBooks, as well as provides a customizable reading experience through configurable font and background color, font size and type, margin size, display brightness, page turn mode, etc. Additionally, the application allows users to import their own books to read them on the go.

== Features ==
1. In-app browsing and downloading capability
2. Read detailed descriptions before purchase & download
3. Adjust front, background, link, layout & text alignment
4. Day/Night themes: switch between day/night mode when reading in high/low-luminosity areas
5. Brightness Control
6. Customizable navigation modes
7. Full support for Table of Contents
8. Bookmarks: allows users to create their own bookmarks anywhere in a book to remember sections of interest
9. Progress: allows users to check their reading progress in a chapter and in a book
10. Share: allows users to recommend books to others via email, Facebook, Twitter, SMS...
11. The reading engine automatically adjusts to the size of the device’s display
12. Library management: books can be organized by Collections
13. Edit detailed book information (title, author, tag, collection, rating)
14. Sort books by title, author, download late, last read date or rating
15. Import: allows users to import their own books to read them on the go
16. Open images within a book in a separate viewer
17. Open links within a book on browser
18. Full text search: allows users to search any word globally within a book
19. Dictionary lookup: allows users to look up any word definition in an online dictionary using Google define.
20. Option to lock display orientation on iOS
21. Option to set text alignment to left, justify or right
22. Go To: allows users to quickly access any position within a book
23. Support for Adobe DRM

== See also ==
- Bluefire jellyfish
