= Blio =

E-reader software

Blio is a free-to-download e-reader software application created by Ray Kurzweil. It was unveiled at the Consumer Electronics Show in Las Vegas in early January 2010. The Blio e-reader preserves typography, supports color illustrations and includes features that make it effective for certain categories of books not well supported by E Ink, such as children's books. Blio also comes with text-to-speech integration, offering both a computerized voice and the synchronization of professionally recorded audiobooks.

Blio iPhone app supports Rapid Serial Visual Presentation (RSVP) mode. RSVP lets the reader process up to 1,000 words per minute by presenting each word individually. The reader controls the rate of presentation with a screen thumb dial.

== See also ==
- 3M Cloud Drive
- Adobe Digital Editions
- Aldiko
- Amazon Kindle applications
- Barnes & Noble Nook e-Reader applications for third party devices
- Calibre
- Google eBooks
- iTunes
- Kobo eReader
