= Lexcycle =

Software company that made electronic book reading software

- Type: Subsidiary of Amazon
- Industry: Electronic books
- Founded: 2008
- Headquarters: Seattle, Washington
- Key people: Marc Prud'hommeaux, Founder/Principal Developer Neelan Choksi, CEO Abe White
- Website: www.lexcycle.com

Lexcycle was a software company that made electronic book reading software. They were responsible for Stanza, which ran on the iPhone, iPod Touch, Microsoft Windows and Apple Macintosh platforms. In April 2009, Lexcycle was acquired by Amazon.com. In 2012, Amazon.com removed Stanza from all app stores.

== See also ==
- E-book
