= Comparison of e-readers =

Comparison of devices for reading e-books

An e-reader, also known as an e-book reader, is a portable electronic device that is designed primarily for the purpose of reading e-books and periodicals. E-readers have a similar form factor to a tablet and usually use electronic paper resulting in better screen readability, especially in bright sunlight; and have longer battery life when compared to a tablet. An e-reader's battery will typically last for multiple weeks. In contrast to an e-reader, a tablet has a screen capable of higher refresh rates which make them more suitable for interaction such as playing a video game or watching a video clip.

== Types of electronic-paper displays ==
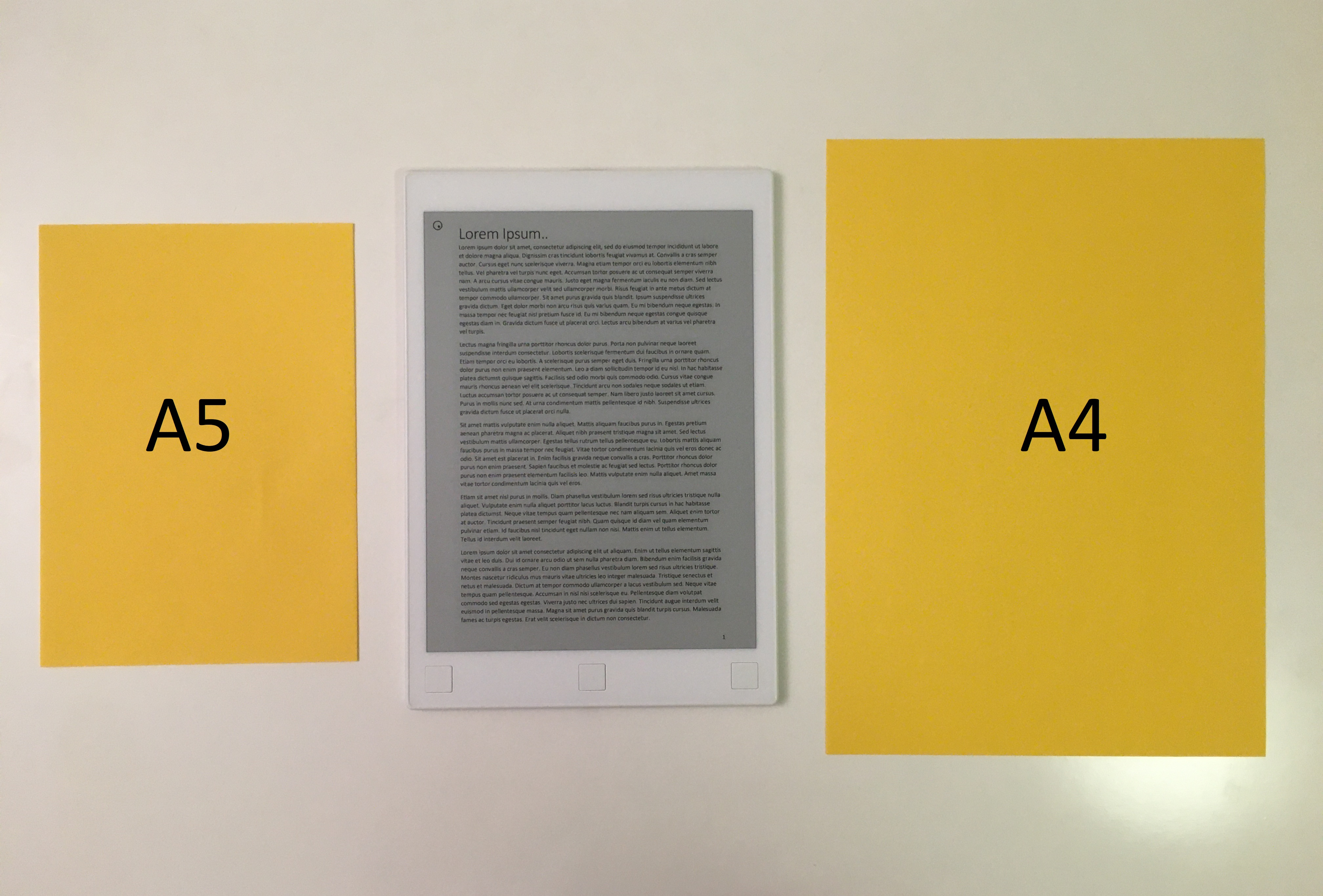
Comparison of screen to paper size: A5 paper, 10.1-inch (257 mm) screen and A4 paper

All electronic paper types offer lower power consumption and better sunlight contrast than LCDs. E Ink displays do not produce any light by themselves, so some models offer a frontlight for reading in dark areas.

- E ink: E Ink Corporation's 1st-generation technology, also known as E Ink Vizplex. Although "eInk" may be used to talk about all electronic paper displays, "eInk" and "E Ink" are trademarked by E Ink, which provides the majority of the electronic paper displays used in devices.
- E Ink Pearl: E Ink's 2nd-generation technology, which has higher contrast and a greater number of different levels of gray than their earlier technology. A further revision of Pearl is Mobius, which uses flexible plastic in the display.
- E Ink Triton: E Ink's 3rd-generation technology that featured the ability to show color in the display.
- E Ink Carta: E Ink's 4th-generation technology, which has higher contrast and a greater number of different levels of gray than their earlier technology; the displays have a pixel density between 212 and 300 ppi.
- E Ink Kaleido: E Ink's colour e-paper display supporting up to 4096 colours, used in various e-readers such as BOOX Go Color 7 and Kobo Libra Colour
- SiPix: A former competitor to E Ink, which had displays with almost instantaneous page turns. It was acquired by E Ink in December 2012.
- LG Flex: Electronic paper that allows a flexible screen; is still in development. With these displays, the user is able to bend the e-reader without damaging it and can fold it up to put in a pocket.

Electronic-paper readers come in various sizes. Many small e-readers have display diagonal sizes around 150 or 180 mm (6 or 7 in), while some of the large commercially available readers have display sizes around A5 (257 mm (10.1 in)) or A4 size (364 mm (14.3 in)).

== Commercially available devices sold by maker or designer ==
Notes:

- Library DRM compatible – Can be used to borrow e-books from public libraries, e.g. the EPUB and/or PDF formats with digital-rights-management (DRM) are supported.
- "microSDHC" is the most popular format for external memory cards. Devices which support a different card have that format listed.
- Listed are only products for which either the product itself or its company is notable, as shown by having a Wikipedia article (without notability notice).

=== Electronic-paper displays ===
Maker	Model	Intro year	Screen size (inch)	Self-lit	Screen type	Dimensions (HxWxD)	Weight	Screen pixels	Pixel density (in pixels per inch)	Touch screen	Button for Page-turn	Wireless network	Text-to-speech	Folders	Internal storage	Micro SDHC	Web browser	Library DRM compatible	USB Content Management	Headphone Jack	Waterproof
Amazon.com	Kindle Oasis Wi-Fi/3G	2016	6 in 7 in	Yes	E-ink Carta		131 g (4.6 oz) (6 in, no cover); 194 g (6.8 oz) (7 in, no cover)	1080 x 1440; 1264 x 1680	300 ppi	2-Point	Yes, one side	Wi-Fi/CDMA, GSM	No	Collections	4, 8 or 32 GB (8.0 GB)	No	Yes	US only	No		
Amazon.com	Kindle Paperwhite (3rd generation) Wi-Fi/3G	2015	6 in	Yes	E-ink Carta		207 g (7.3 oz)	1080 x 1430	300 ppi	2-Point	No	Wi-Fi/CDMA, GSM	No	Collections	4 GB (3.25 GB)	No	Yes	US only	No		
Amazon.com	Kindle Voyage	2014	6 in	Yes	E-ink Carta		180 g (6.3 oz)	1080 x 1430	300 ppi	2-Point	Sensors on both sides	Wi-Fi/CDMA, GSM	No	Collections	4 GB (3.25 GB)	No	Yes	US only	No		
Amazon.com	Kindle (7th generation)	2014	6 in	No	E-ink Pearl		191 g (6.7 oz)	600 × 800	167 ppi	Yes	No	Wi-Fi	No	Collections	4 GB (3.25 GB)	No	Yes	US only	No		
Barnes & Noble	Nook Simple Touch with GlowLight	2012	6 in	Yes	E-ink Pearl		212 g (7.5 oz)	600 × 800	167 ppi	Yes	Yes	Wi-Fi	No	Yes	2 GB	Yes	Yes, hidden web browser	Yes	No		
Barnes & Noble	Nook GlowLight	2013	6 in	Yes	E-ink Pearl		175 g (6.2 oz)	758 × 1024	212 ppi	Yes	No	Wi-Fi	No	Yes	4 GB (2.5 GB usable) (512 MB for user content)	No	Yes	Yes	Yes		
Barnes & Noble	Nook GlowLight Plus	2015	6 in	Yes	E-ink Carta		195 g (6.9 oz)	1080 × 1430	300 ppi	Yes	No	Wi-Fi	No	Yes	4 GB (2.5 GB usable) (512 MB for user content)	No	Yes	Yes	Yes		
Barnes & Noble	Nook Glowlight 3	2017	6 in	Yes	E-ink Carta		195 g (6.9 oz)	1072 × 1448	300 ppi	Yes	Yes	Wi-Fi	No	Yes	8 GB (6.5 GB usable)	No	Yes	Yes	Yes		
Barnes & Noble	Nook GlowLight Plus 7.8	2019	7.8 in	Yes	E-ink Carta		195 g (6.9 oz)	1404 x 1872	300 ppi	Yes	Yes	Wi-Fi	No	Yes	8 GB (6.5 GB usable)	No	Yes	Yes	Yes	Yes	Yes
Bookeen	Cybook Odyssey HD FrontLight	2012	6 in	Yes	E-ink Pearl + HSIS		212 g (7.5 oz)	758 × 1024	212 ppi	Yes	Yes	Wi-Fi (n)	No	Yes	2 GB	Yes	Yes	Yes	No		
Bookeen	Cybook Odyssey	2013	6 in	No	E-ink Pearl + HSIS		180 g (6.35 oz)	600 × 800	167 ppi	Yes	Unknown	Wi-Fi (n)	No	Yes	2 GB	Yes	Yes	Yes	No		
Bookeen	Cybook Orizon	2010	6 in	No	SiPix		245 g (8.6 oz)	600 × 800	167 ppi	Yes	Yes	Wi-Fi (n), Bluetooth 2.1+EDR	No	Yes	2 GB	Yes	Yes	Yes	No		
Bookeen	Cybook Muse HD	2016	6 in	Yes	E-ink Carta		180 g (6.3 oz)	1072 × 1448	300 ppi	Yes	Yes	Wi-Fi (b/g/n)	No	Yes	8 GB	Yes	Yes	Yes	No		
Boyue	T62+	2015	6 in	Yes	E-ink Carta + front-light		222 g (7.83 oz)	758 × 1024	212 ppi	Yes	Yes	Wi-Fi (n)	Yes*	Yes	8 GB	Yes	Yes	Yes	Yes		
bq readers	Movistar ebook	2011	6 in	No	AUO + SiPix		244 g (8.6 oz)	600 × 800	167 ppi	Yes	Unknown	Wi-Fi	Unknown	Unknown	2 GB	up to 16 GB	Yes	Yes	No		
Tolino	tolino shine 3	2018	6 in	Yes	E-ink Carta	110,2 x 156,4 x 8,35 mm	166 g	768 × 1024	212 ppi	Yes	No	Wi-Fi (b/g/n)	No	Yes	8 GB (6 GB available for user) + 25 GB tolino cloud	No	Yes	Yes	Yes		
Tolino	tolino page 2	2019	6 in	Yes	E-ink Carta	112,5 x 159,8 x 9,1 mm	166 g	1072 × 1448	300 ppi	Yes	No	Wi-Fi (b/g/n)	No	Yes	8 GB (6 GB available for user) + 25 GB tolino cloud	No	Yes	Yes	Yes		
Tolino	tolino vision 5	2019	7 in	Yes	E-ink Carta	158,6 × 144,2 × 5,2 mm	195 g	1264 × 1680	300 ppi	Yes	Yes	Wi-Fi (b/g/n)	No	Yes	8 GB (6 GB available for user) + 25 GB tolino cloud	No	Yes	Yes	Yes		
Tolino	tolino epos 2	2019	8 in	Yes	E-ink Carta	159 x 177,5 x 3,9 mm	195 g	1440 × 1920	300 ppi	Yes	Yes	Wi-Fi (b/g/n)	No	Yes	8 GB (6 GB available for user) + 25 GB tolino cloud	No	Yes	Yes	Yes		
Elonex	621EB	2009	6 in	No	E-ink		180 g (6.3 oz)	600 × 800	167 ppi	No	Unknown	No	No	No	1 GB	Yes	No	Yes	No		
Icarus Reader	Icarus Excel	2012	9.7 in	No	E-ink Pearl		530 g (19 oz)	825 × 1200	150 ppi	No	Yes	Wi-Fi	Yes	Unknown	4 GB	Yes	Yes	Unknown	Unknown		
Icarus Reader	Icarus 8	2013	8 in	No	ePaper		300 g (10.5 oz)	768 × 1024	160 ppi	No	Unknown	Wi-Fi	Unknown	Yes	4 GB	Yes	Unknown	Yes	Unknown		
Icarus Reader	Icarus Essence	2013	6 in	No	ePaper		220 g (7.8 oz)	600 x 800	167 ppi	No	Unknown	Wi-Fi	Unknown	Yes	4 GB	Yes	Unknown	Yes	Unknown		
Icarus Reader	Icarus Sense G2	2011	6 in	No	E-ink		220 g (7.8 oz)	600 × 800	167 ppi	Yes	Unknown	Wi-Fi	No	Yes	2 GB (1.3 GB)	Yes	Yes	Yes	Unknown		
Icarus Reader	Illumina Pro	2016	9.7 in	Yes	E-ink Pearl HD		220 g (7.8 oz)	825 x 1200	150 ppi	Yes	Yes	Wi-Fi	No	Yes	16 GB (11 GB)	Yes	Yes	Yes	Yes		
Iriver	Iriver Story HD	2011	6 in	No	E-ink Pearl		207 g (7.3 oz)	768 × 1024	213 ppi	No	Yes	Wi-Fi	No	Yes	2 GB	SDHC	No	Yes	Yes		
JinKe	Hanlin V5	2009	5 in	No	E-ink		160 g (5.6 oz)	600 × 800	200 ppi	No	Unknown	No	Yes	Unknown	512 MB	SDHC 16 GB	No	Unknown	Unknown		
Boyue	Boyue Likebook Plus	2017	7.8 in	Yes	E-ink Carta	198 x 144 x 8.3 mm	290 g (10.2 oz)	1404 x 1872	300 ppi	Yes	No	Wi-Fi	No	Unknown	16 GB	No	Yes	PDF, EPUB, FB2, RTF, MOBI, TXT, HTML/HTM, DJVU/DJV, JPG, PNG, etc.	Yes		
Icarus	Icarus Illumina XL HD	2017	7.8 in	Yes	E-ink Carta	200 x 145 x 9 mm	275 g (9.7 oz)	1404 x 1872	300 ppi	Yes	No	Wi-Fi	No	Unknown	16 GB	No	Yes	Yes	Yes		
Kobo Inc.	Kobo Nia	2020	6 in	Yes	E-ink Carta	112.4 x 159.3 x 9.2 mm	172 g (6.06 oz)	1024 x 758	212 ppi	Yes	No	Wi-Fi	No	shelves	8 GB	No	Yes	Yes	Yes		
Kobo Inc.	Kobo Libra H2O	2019	7 in	Yes	E-ink Carta	144 x 159 x 7.8 mm	192g	1264 x 1680	300 ppi	Yes	Yes	Wi-Fi (2.4ghz only)	No	shelves	8 GB	No	Yes	Yes	Yes	No	Yes
Kobo Inc.	Kobo Clara HD	2018	6 in	Yes	E-ink Carta	195.1 x 138.5 x 6.9 mm	166 g (5.8 oz)	1072 x 1448	300 ppi	Yes	No	Wi-Fi	No	shelves	8 GB	No	Yes	Yes	Yes		
Kobo Inc.	Kobo Aura One	2016	7.8 in	Yes	E-ink Carta	195.1 x 138.5 x 6.9 mm	230 g (8.1 oz)	1404 x 1872	300 ppi	Yes	No	Wi-Fi	No	shelves	8 / 32 GB	No	Yes	Yes	Yes		
Kobo Inc.	Kobo Aura Edition 2	2016	6 in	Yes	E-ink Carta	159 x 113 x 8.5 mm	180 g (6.3 oz)	768 x 1024	212 ppi	Yes	No	Wi-Fi	No	shelves	4 GB	No	Yes	Yes	Yes		
Kobo Inc.	Kobo Touch 2.0	2015	6 in	Yes	E-ink Pearl		185 g (6.5 oz)	600 x 800	167 ppi	Yes	No	Wi-Fi	No	shelves	4 GB	No	Yes	Yes	Yes		
Kobo Inc.	Kobo Glo HD	2015	6 in	Yes	E-ink Carta		180 g (6.3 oz)	1072 × 1448	300 ppi	Yes	No	Wi-Fi	No	shelves	4 GB	No	Yes	Yes	Yes		
Kobo Inc.	Kobo Aura H2O	2014	6.8 in	Yes	E-ink Carta	179 x 129 x 9.7 mm	233 g (8.2 oz)	1080 × 1430	265 ppi	Yes	No	Wi-Fi	No	shelves	4 GB	Yes	Yes	Yes	Yes		
Kobo Inc.	Kobo Aura HD	2013	6.8 in	Yes	E-ink Pearl		240 g (8.5 oz)	1080 × 1440	265 ppi	Yes	No	Wi-Fi	No	shelves	4 GB	Yes	Yes	Yes	Yes		
Kobo Inc.	Kobo Aura	2013	6 in	Yes	E-ink Pearl		174 g (6.1 oz)	758 x 1024	212 ppi	Yes	No	Wi-Fi	No	shelves	4 GB	Yes	Yes	Yes	Yes		
Kolporter	eClicto	2007	6 in	No	E-ink		174 g (6.1 oz)	600 × 800	167 ppi	No	Unknown	No	No	Unknown	512 MB	SD	No	Unknown	Unknown		
Manta	Ebook04	2014	6 in	No	E-ink		Unknown	600 × 800	167 ppi	No	Yes	Wi-Fi	No	Yes	4 GB	up to 32 GB	Yes	Yes	Yes		
Onyx Inc.	BOOX C65 Storia	2013	6 in	No	E-ink		186 g (8.4 oz)	758 x 1024	212 ppi	Yes (Capacitive)	No	Wi-Fi	Yes	Yes	4 GB	Yes	Unknown	No	Yes		
Onyx Inc.	BOOX C65 AfterGlow	2013	6 in	Yes	E-ink		186 g (8.4 oz)	758 x 1024	212 ppi	Yes (Capacitive)	No	Wi-Fi	Yes	Yes	4 GB	Yes	Unknown	No	Yes		
Onyx Inc.	BOOX M92/92S Black Pearl	2011	9.7 in	No	E-ink Pearl		520 g (18 oz)	825 × 1200	150 ppi	Stylus	Yes	Wi-Fi	Yes	Yes	4 GB	Yes	Yes	No	Yes		
Onyx Inc.	BOOX M96	2014	9.7 in	No	E-ink Pearl		520 g (18 oz)	825 × 1200	150 ppi	Stylus	Yes	Wi-Fi, Bluetooth 4.0 Low Energy	Yes	Yes	4 GB	up to 32 GB SD Card	Yes	Yes	Yes		
Onyx Inc.	BOOX T68 Lynx	2014	6.8 in	Yes	E-ink Pearl		236 g (8.325 oz)	1080 x 1440	265 ppi	Yes (Capacitive)	Yes	Wi-Fi, Bluetooth 4.0 Low Energy	Yes	Unknown	4 GB	up to 32 GB	Yes	Yes	Unknown		
Onyx Inc.	BOOX N96	2016	9.7 in	Yes (ML version only)	E-ink Pearl		443-461 g (16 oz)	825 × 1200	150 ppi	Yes (N96ML only with Stylus)	Yes	Wi-Fi, Bluetooth 4.0 Low Energy	Yes	Yes	16 GB	up to 32 GB SD Card	Yes	Yes	Yes		
Onyx Inc.	BOOX Max	2016	13.3 in (letter=13.9 in, A4=14.3 in)	No	E-ink Mobius		496 g (17.5 oz)	1200 × 1600	150 ppi	Stylus	Yes	Wi-Fi, Bluetooth 4.0 Low Energy	Yes	Yes	16 GB	up to 32 GB SD Card	Yes	Yes	Yes		
Onyx Inc.	BOOX Max Carta	2017	13.3 in (letter=13.9 in, A4=14.3 in)	No	E-ink Carta		550 g (19.5 oz)	1650 × 2200	207 ppi	Stylus	Yes	Wi-Fi, Bluetooth 4.0 Low Energy	Yes	Yes	16 GB	up to 32 GB SD Card	Yes	Yes	Yes		
PocketBook	PocketBook Touch HD 3	2019	6 in	Yes	E-ink Carta	161,3 × 108 × 8 mm	155 g	1072 × 1448	300 ppi	Yes	Yes	Wi-Fi, Bluetooth	Yes	Yes	16 GB	No	Yes	Yes	Yes		
PocketBook	PocketBook CAD Reader	2014	13.3 in (letter=13.9 in, A4=14.3 in)	No	E-ink Fina		700 g	1200 × 1600	150 ppi	Unknown	Unknown	Wi-Fi	Unknown	Unknown	16 GB	up to 64 GB	Unknown	Unknown	Yes		
PocketBook	PocketBook CAD Reader Flex	2014	13.3 in (letter=13.9 in, A4=14.3 in)	No	E-ink Mobius		700 g	1200 × 1600	150 ppi	Unknown	Unknown	Wi-Fi	Unknown	Unknown	8 GB	up to 64 GB	Unknown	Unknown	Yes		
PocketBook	PocketBook 360 Plus	2011	5 in	No	E-ink		150 g (5.3 oz)	600 × 800	200 ppi	No	Unknown	Wi-Fi	Yes	Yes	2 GB	Yes	Yes	Yes	Unknown		
PocketBook	PocketBook Pro 912	2011	9.7 in	No	E-ink		565 g (20 oz)	825 × 1200	150 ppi	Yes	Unknown	Wi-Fi, Bluetooth	Yes	Yes	2 GB (1.2 GB)	Yes	Yes	Yes	Unknown		
PocketBook	PocketBook Touch	2011	6 in	No	E-ink Pearl		195 g (6.9 oz)	600 × 800	167 ppi	Yes	Unknown	Wi-Fi, Bluetooth, UMTS + GPRS	Yes	Yes	2 GB	Yes	Yes	Yes	Unknown		
PocketBook	PocketBook Basic New	2012	6 in	No	E-ink		180 g (6.3 oz)	600 × 800	167 ppi	No	Unknown	?	?	Yes	2 GB	up to 32 GB	Yes	Yes	Unknown		
reMarkable	reMarkable	2017	10.3 in (A5=10.1 in)	No	E-ink Carta CANVAS	256 x 177 x 6.7mm (10.1 x 6.9 x .26in)	350 g (0.77 lb)	1404 x 1872	226 ppi	Yes	Yes	Wi-Fi	No	Yes	8 GB	No	No	PDF and ePUB	Beta		
reMarkable	reMarkable 2	2020	10.3 in (A5=10.1 in)?	No	E-ink Carta CANVAS (?)	256 x 177 x 4.7mm (10.1 x 6.9 x .26in) (?)	350 g (0.77 lb)	1404 x 1872	226 ppi	Yes	Yes	Wi-Fi	No	Yes	8 GB	No	No	PDF and ePUB	Beta		
Sony	DPT-RP1	2017	13.3 in (letter=13.9 in, A4=14.3 in)	No	E-ink Carta		349 g (12.3 oz)	1650 x 2200	207 ppi	Yes	No	Wi-Fi b/g/n Bluetooth NFC	No	Yes	16 GB	No	No	PDF only	Yes		
TrekStor	Pyrus	2012	6 in	No	Digital Ink		216 g (7.6 oz)	600 × 800	167 ppi	No	Yes, both sides	No	No	Yes	2 or 4 GB	Yes	No	Unknown	Unknown		
TrekStor	Pyrus 2 LED	2013	6 in	No	E-ink Pearl		205 g (7.2 oz)	600 × 800	167 ppi	Yes	Yes	No	No	Yes	2 GB	Yes	No	Unknown	Unknown		
TrekStor	Pyrus mini	2013	4.3 in	No	Digital Ink		111 g (3.9 oz)	600 × 800	233 ppi	No		No	No	Yes	2 GB	Yes	No	Unknown	Unknown		
txtr	beagle	2013	5 in	No	E-ink		128 g (4.5 oz)	600 x 800	200 ppi	No	Unknown	Bluetooth	No	No	5 books, up to 4 GB	No	No	Yes	No		
Various private labels	6"; 4:3, Capacitive touch, EPD AUO+SiPix 16 grayscale Contrast Ratio: 6:1, Whiteness: 30% (w/ touch)	varies	6 in	No	SiPix		240 g (8.5 oz)	600 × 800	167 ppi	Yes	Unknown	Wi-Fi	Yes*	Yes	2 GB	SDHC	Yes	Unknown	No		
Fidibook	Hannah F1 Wi-Fi	2018	6 in	Yes	E-ink	159.5 x 118 x 8 mm	190 g	1024 x 758	212 ppi	Yes	Yes	Wi-Fi	No	No	8 GB	Up to 16 GB	Yes	No	Yes		
Maker	Model	Intro year	Screen size (inch)	Self-lit	Screen type	Dimensions (HxWxD)	Weight	Screen pixels	Ppi	Touch screen	Button for Page-turn	Wireless network	Text-to-speech	Folders	Internal storage	Micro SDHC	Web browser	Library DRM compatible	USB peripherals		

==== Private label hardware ====
Some common hardware is resold in different national markets under various brand names. Below is the list of identical hardware:

- manufacturer device name→ screen model, compatible screen models (first is better) → rebranded devices
- Boeye C60 → ED060SCE(LF), ED060SC7(LF) → Gmini MagicBook Z6, Digma E605, DigmaE625
- Boeye G6 → ? → Amazon Kindle 2
- Boeye G10 → ED097OC4(LF) → Amazon Kindle DX
- Hanlin V3 → ED060SC8, ED060SC9, ED060SC4(LF), LB060S02-RD01, LB060S01-RD02 → BeBook : BeBook, Koobe, Astak EZ Reader, Lbook V3, Papyre 6.1 (E1/E2) (Spain)
- Hanlin V60 → ED060SC8, ED060SC9, ED060SC4(LF), LB060S02-RD01, LB060S01-RD02 or ED060SC7(LF), ED060SCE(LF) → LBook V60 (white or black), Papyre 613 (v1 or v2), E-Reader Onda Biblet TB600KT con WiFi e 3G, Koobe Be Free
- ? → 6" → Netronix EB001, Astak Mentor EZ Reader, Cybook Gen3 (200 MHz version)
- ? → 6" → Netronix EB600, Cool-er, eClicto, Elonex eBook, eSlick, Astaka Mentor EZ Reader, Cybook Gen3 (400 MHz version)
- ? → 6" → Condor eGriver touch, Medion OYO, Prestigio PER5062B, Icarus Sense, Pandigital Novel 6" Personal eReader, Qisda QD060B00
- ? → 6" → TrekStor eBook Reader 3.0, Prestigio Nobile PER3172B
- ? → ED060SC7(LF) → Papyre 601, Wexler E6003, Prology Latitude I-601, Ritmix RBK-600, Assistant AE-601, DNS Airbook EYT601, Texet TB-146
- ? → ED060SCE(LF) → Qumo Libro Basic, Woxter Paperlight 300
- ? → 6" SiPix Touchscreen display, 800x600px, 167ppi, 16 levels of grayscale → bq Movistar, bq Avant, egriver Touch (India), postitivo Alfa (Brazil), e-vrit (Israel), Papyre 6.2 (Spain).

==== Discontinued models ====
Maker	Model	Intro year	End year	Screen size (inch)	Self-lit	Screen type	Screen model	Weight	Screen pixels	Touch screen	Wireless network	Text-to-speech	Folders	Internal storage	Micro SDHC	Web browser	Library DRM compatible	USB peripherals
Aluratek	Libre Ebook Reader Pro	2009	2014	5 in	No	ePaper		213 g (7.5 oz)	600 × 800	No	No	No	Yes	90 MB	up to 32 GB	No	Yes	No
Amazon.com	Kindle Paperwhite (2nd generation) Wi-Fi/3G	2013	2015	6 in	Yes	e-ink Carta		215 g (7.6 oz)	758 × 1024	2-Point	Wi-Fi/CDMA, GSM	No	Yes	2 GB (1.25 GB)	No	Yes	US only	No
Amazon.com	Kindle Paperwhite 1st generation	2012	2013	6 in	Yes	e-ink Pearl		221 g (7.8 oz)	758 × 1024	2-Point	Wi-Fi/CDMA, GSM	No	Yes	2 GB (1.25 GB)	No	Yes	US only	No
Amazon.com	Kindle (5th generation)	2012	2014	6 in	No	e-ink Pearl		170 g (5.98 oz)	600 × 800	No	Wi-Fi	No	Yes	2 GB (1.25 GB)	No	Yes	US only	No
Amazon.com	Kindle (4th generation)	2011	2012	6 in	No	e-ink Pearl		170 g (6 oz)	600 × 800	No	Wi-Fi	No	Yes	2 GB (1.25 GB)	No	Yes	US only	No
Amazon.com	Kindle Touch 3G/Wi-Fi	2011	2012	6 in	No	e-ink Pearl		220 g (7.8 oz)	600 × 800	Yes	Wi-Fi/CDMA, GSM	Yes	Yes	4 GB (3 GB)	No	Yes	US only	No
Amazon.com	Kindle Keyboard Wi-Fi/3G	2010	2011	6 in	No	e-ink Pearl	ED060SC7(LF)	247 g (8.7 oz)	600 × 800	No	Wi-Fi/CDMA, GSM	Yes	Yes	4 GB (3 GB)	No	Yes	US only	No
Amazon.com	Kindle DX 1st gen white	2009	2011	9.7 in	No	e-ink		540 g (19 oz)	824 × 1200	No	CDMA (USA), GSM	Yes	Yes	4 GB (3.3 GB)	No	limited	US only	No
Amazon.com	Kindle DX 2nd gen graphite	2010	2012	9.7 in	No	e-ink Pearl		535 g (18.9 oz)	824 × 1200	No	HSDPA/GSM	Yes	Yes	4 GB (3.3 GB)	No	limited	US only	No
Amazon.com	Kindle 2	2009	2010	6 in	No	e-ink		289 g (10.2 oz)	600 × 800	No	CDMA (USA), GSM (World)	Yes	Yes	2 GB (1.4 GB)	No	limited	US only	No
Amazon.com	Kindle	2007	2009	6 in	No	e-ink		289 g (10.2 oz)	600 × 800	No	CDMA	No	No	256 MB (180 MB)	SD	limited	US only	No
Asus	EEE Reader DR-900	2010	2010	9 in	No	SiPix		440 g (16 oz)	768 × 1024	Yes	Wi-Fi	Yes	Yes	2 GB	microSD	Yes	No	Yes
Barnes & Noble	Nook Simple Touch	2011	2013	6 in	No	e-ink Pearl		212 g (7.5 oz)	600 × 800	Yes	Yes	Wi-Fi	Yes	2 GB	Yes	No	Yes	No
Barnes & Noble	Nook	2009	2011	6 in	No	e-ink		343 g (12.1 oz)	600 × 800	Bottom	Wi-Fi UMTS⌥	No	(FW v1.5)	2 GB (1.3 GB)	Yes	Yes (FW v1.3)	Yes	No
Bookeen	Cybook Gen3	2007	?	6 in	No	e-ink		174 g (6.1 oz)	600 × 800	No	No	No	Yes	16 MB, 512 MB, 1 GB	SD	No	Yes	No
Bookeen	Cybook Opus	2009	?	5 in	No	e-ink		150 g (5.3 oz)	600 × 800	No	No	No	Yes	1 GB	Yes	No	Yes	No
Ectaco	JetBook Color	2012	?	9.7 in	No	e-ink Triton		662 g (23.4 oz)	1200 × 1600, ppi 206	Unknown, button for page turn yes	Yes	Yes	Yes	Yes (unknown size)	up to 32 GB	No	Yes, OPDS, Atom	Yes
EnTourage	EnTourage eDGe	2010	2011	9.7 in	No	e-ink & LCD		1,400 g (49 oz)	825 × 1200	Yes	Wi-Fi, Bluetooth	Yes (Pico TTS)	Yes	3 GB (10% for apps)	SD 32 GB	Yes	Yes	Yes
EnTourage	Pocket eDGe	2010	2011	6 in	No	e-ink & LCD		700 g (25 oz)	600 × 800	Yes	Wi-Fi, Bluetooth	Yes (Pico TTS)	Yes	3 GB	micro SD	Yes	Yes	Unknown
Fnac	FnacBook	2010	2011	6 in	No	e-ink		240 g (8.5 oz)	600 × 800	Yes	Wi-Fi GPRS, Edge, HSDPA	Yes	Unknown	2 GB	micro SD	Yes	Yes	Unknown
Foxit Software	eSlick	2009	2010	6 in	No	e-ink		180 g (6.3 oz)	600 × 800	No	No	No	No	512 MB	SDHC	No	Unknown	Unknown
Franklin	eBookMan	1999	2002	Unknown	Yes	LCD		Unknown	Unknown	Yes	No	No	Unknown	16 MB	MMC	No	Unknown	Yes
Icarus Reader	Icarus Reader Go	2010	?	6 in	No	e-ink		178 g (6.3 oz)	600 × 800	No	Wi-Fi, UMTS ⌥	No	(FW v1.5)	2 GB (1.3 GB)	micro SD	No	Yes	Unknown
Icarus Reader	Icarus Pocket	2012	?	6 in	No	e-ink Pearl		214 g (7.7 oz)	800 × 600	No	Wi-Fi	Unknown	Yes	4 GB	SDHC 32 GB	Unknown	Yes	Unknown
Icarus Reader	Icarus Reader Sense	2010	?	6 in	No	SiPix		240 g (8.5 oz)	600 × 800	Yes	Wi-Fi	No	Yes	2 GB (1.3 GB)	micro SD	Yes	Yes	Unknown
Intreeo	Vivid	2010	2011	6 in	No	e-ink		170 g (5.9 oz)	600 × 800	No	No	No	Unknown	2 GB (1.3 GB)	SD	Unknown	No	Unknown
iRex Technologies	Digital Reader 800	2010	2010	8.1 in	No	e-ink		360 g (13 oz)	768 × 1024	Yes	No	Unknown	Yes	128 MB	SDHC	No	Yes	Unknown
iRex Technologies	Digital Reader 1000	2008	2010	10.2 in	No	e-ink		700 g (25 oz)	1024 × 1280	Stylus	No	No	Yes	No	SD	No	Yes	Yes
iRex Technologies	iLiad	2006	2010	8.1 in	No	e-ink		480 g (17 oz)	768 × 1024	Yes	Wi-Fi	No	Yes	64 MB	SD, CF	No	Yes	Unknown
Iriver	Story	2009	2011	6 in	No	e-ink		233 g (8.2 oz)	600 × 800	Yes	No	Unknown	Unknown	2 GB	SDHC	Unknown	Yes	Unknown
JinKe	Hanlin V3	2007	2008	6 in	No	e-ink	ED060SC4(LF)	Unknown	600 × 800	No	No	No	Yes	384 MB	SDHC	No	Yes	No
JinKe	Hanlin V2	2006	2007	6 in	No	e-ink		Unknown	600 × 800	Unknown	Unknown	Unknown	Unknown	Unknown	Unknown	Unknown	Unknown	Unknown
JinKe	Hanlin V60	2010	?	6 in	No	e-ink	LB060S02-RD01 ED060SC7(LF)	260 g (8.6 oz)	600 × 800	No	Wi-Fi	No	Yes	2G	SDHC	No	Unknown	Yes
Kobo Inc.	Kobo Glo	2012	2015	6 in	Yes	e-ink Pearl		185 g (6.5 oz)	758 × 1024	Yes	Wi-Fi	No	shelves	2 GB	Yes	Yes	Yes	Yes
Kobo Inc.	Kobo Mini	2012	2014	5 in	No	e-ink Vizplex		134 g (4.7 oz)	600 × 800	Yes	Wi-Fi	No	shelves	2 GB	No	Yes	Yes	Yes
Kobo Inc.	Kobo Touch	2011	2013	6 in	No	e-ink Pearl		200 g (7.1 oz)	600 × 800	Yes	Wi-Fi	No	shelves	2 GB	Yes	Yes	Yes	Yes
Kobo Inc.	Kobo eReader Wireless	2010	2011	6 in	No	e-ink		221 g (7.8 oz)	600 × 800	No	Wi-Fi	No	Unknown	1 GB	SD 4 GB	No	Yes	Unknown
Kobo Inc.	Kobo eReader	2010	2011	6 in	No	e-ink		221 g (7.8 oz)	600 × 800	No	Bluetooth	No	Unknown	1 GB	SD	Yes	Yes	Unknown
Kogan.com	Kogan eBook Reader	2010	?	6 in	No	e-ink		228 g (8 oz)	600 × 800	No	No	No	Yes	2 GB	SDHC	No	Unknown	Unknown
Kyobo Inc.	Kyobo E-reader Mirasol	2011	2012	5.7 in	No	Mirasol		294 g (10.4 oz)	768 × 1024	Yes	Wi-Fi	Yes	Unknown	Unknown GB	SDHC	Yes	Unknown	Yes
Onyx Inc.	BOOX A60/62	2009	2012	6 in	No	e-ink		298 g	600 x 800	Yes	Wi-Fi	Yes	Yes	512 MB	SDHC	Yes	No	Yes
Onyx Inc.	BOOX X60/60S	2010	2011	6 in	No	e-ink		298 g (10.5 oz)	600 × 800	Yes	Wi-Fi	Yes	Yes	512 MB	SDHC	Yes	No	Yes
Onyx Inc.	BOOX M90/M90S	2010	2011	9.7 in	No	e-ink Pearl		275 g (9.7 oz)	600 × 800	Yes	Wi-Fi	Yes	Yes	2 GB	SDHC	Yes	No	Yes
Onyx Inc.	BOOX i62 Touch Espresso	2011	2013	6 in	No	e-ink Pearl		238 g (8.4 oz)	600 x 800	Yes (IR)	Wi-Fi	Yes	Yes	4 GB	Yes	Yes	No	Yes
Onyx Inc.	BOOX i62ML HD Angel Glow	2012	2013	6 in	Yes	e-ink		238 g (8.4 oz)	758 × 1024	Yes (IR)	Wi-Fi	Yes	Yes	4 GB	Yes	Yes	No	Yes
PocketBook	PocketBook Pro 603	2010	?	6 in	No	e-ink		280 g (9.9 oz)	600 × 800	Stylus	Wi-Fi, Bluetooth, UMTS + GPRS	Yes	Yes	2 GB	Yes	Yes	Yes	Unknown
PocketBook	PocketBook Pro 602	2010	?	6 in	No	e-ink		250 g (8.8 oz)	600 × 800	No	Wi-Fi, Bluetooth	Yes	Yes	2 GB	Yes	Yes	Yes	Unknown
PocketBook	PocketBook Pro 903	2010	2011	9.7 in	No	e-ink		581 g (20.5 oz)	825 × 1200	Stylus	Wi-Fi, Bluetooth, UMTS + GPRS	Yes	Yes	2 GB	Yes	Yes	Yes	Unknown
PocketBook	PocketBook Pro 902	2010	2011	9.7 in	No	e-ink		530 g (19 oz)	825 × 1200	No	Wi-Fi, Bluetooth	Yes	Yes	2 GB	Yes	Yes	Yes	Unknown
Samsung	Papyrus	2009	2010	5 in	No	e-ink		184 g (6.5 oz)	600 × 800	Yes	No	Yes	Unknown	512M	No	Unknown	Yes	Unknown
Samsung	E6	2010	2011	6 in	No	e-ink		315 g (11.1 oz)	600 × 800	Stylus	Wi-Fi, Bluetooth	Yes	Yes	2 GB (1.4 GB)	micro SD	limited	Yes	Unknown
Sony	DPT-S1	2014	2016	13.3 in (letter=13.9 in, A4=14.3 in)	No	e-ink Mobius		357g (12.6 oz)	1200 x 1600	Yes	Wi-Fi b/g/n	No	Yes	4 GB	Yes	Yes	PDF only	Yes
Sony	Sony Reader Pocket Edition PRS-300SC	2011	2012	5 in	No	e-ink Vizplex		220 g (7.8 oz)	600 × 800	No	No	No	Unknown	512 MB (350 MB)	No	No	Yes	Unknown
Sony	Sony Reader Pocket Edition PRS-350	2010	2011	5 in	No	e-ink Pearl		155 g (5.5 oz)	600 × 800	Yes	No	No	collections	2 GB (1.4 GB)	No	No	Yes	Unknown
Sony	Sony Reader Touch Edition PRS-650	2010	2011	6 in	No	e-ink		215 g (7.6 oz)	600 × 800	Yes	No	No	collections	2 GB (1.4 GB)	SDHC, MSPro DUO	No	Yes	Unknown
Sony	Sony Reader Daily Edition PRS-900	2009	2011	7.1 in	No	e-ink		283 g (10.0 oz)	600 × 1024	Yes	No	No	Unknown	2 GB	SDHC, MSPro DUO	Unknown	Yes	Unknown
Sony	Sony Reader Touch Edition PRS-600	2009	2010	6 in	No	e-ink		286 g (10.1 oz)	600 × 800	Yes	No	No	Unknown	512 MB (380 MB)	SDHC, MSPro Duo	No	Yes	Unknown
Sony	Sony Reader Pocket Edition PRS-300	2009	2010	5 in	No	e-ink		220 g (7.8 oz)	600 × 800	No	No	No	Unknown	512 MB (480 MB)	No	No	Yes	Unknown
Sony	Sony Reader PRS-700	2008	2009	6 in	Yes	e-ink		283 g (10 oz)	600 × 800	Yes	No	Unknown	Unknown	512 MB	SDHC	Unknown	Yes	Unknown
Sony	Reader PRS-505	2008	2009	6 in	No	e-ink		250 g (8.8 oz)	600 × 800	No	No	No	Unknown	256 MB (192 MB)	SD, MS	No	Yes	Unknown
Sony	Sony Reader PRS-500	2006	2008	6 in	No	e-ink		250 g (8.8 oz)	600 × 800	No	No	No	No	92 MB	SD	No	Yes	Unknown
Sony	Reader PRS-T1	2011	2012	6 in	No	e-ink Pearl		168 g (5.9 oz)	600 × 800	Yes (IR)	Wi-Fi	No	Collections	2 GB (1.3 GB)	Yes	Yes	Yes	Unknown
Sony	Reader PRS-T2	2012	2013	6 in	No	e-ink Pearl		167 g (5.9 oz)	600 × 800	2-Point	Wi-Fi	No	Collections	2 GB (1.3 GB)	Yes	Yes	Yes	Unknown
Sony	Reader PRS-T3	2013	2014	6 in	No	e-ink Pearl		198 g (6.9 oz)	758 x 1024	2-Point	Wi-Fi	No	Collections	2 GB (1.3 GB)	Yes	Yes	Yes	Unknown
Tolino	Tolino shine	2013	2015	6 in	Yes	E-ink Pearl		183 g (6.5 oz)	758 × 1024	Yes	Yes	No	Yes	4 GB (2 GB)	Yes	Yes	Yes	Unknown
Tolino	Tolino vision	2014	2015	6 in	Yes	E-ink Carta		178 g	758 × 1024	Yes	Wi-Fi	No	Yes	2 GB	Yes	Yes	Yes	Unknown
Tolino	Tolino vision 4 HD	2016	2019	6 in	Yes	E-ink Carta		175 g	1448 × 1072	Yes	Wi-Fi (b/g/n)	No	Yes	8 GB (6 GB available for user)	No	Yes	Yes	Unknown
Tolino	Tolino Epos	2017	2019	7.8 in	Yes	E-ink Carta		260 g (9.2 oz)	1404 x 1872	Yes	Wi-Fi	No	Yes	8 GB	No	Yes	Yes	Unknown
TrekStor	Pyrus maxi	2013	2014	8 in	No	Digital Ink		309 g (10.9 oz)	768 × 1024	No	No	No	Yes	4 GB	Yes	No	Yes	Unknown
Wexler	Flex ONE	2012	2013	6 in	No	LG flex		110 g (3.9 oz)	768 x 1024	No	No	No	Yes	8 GB	No	No	No	Unknown
Wexler	WEXLER.BOOK E6003	2012	?	6 in	No	e-ink	ED060SC7(LF)	175 g (5.7 oz)	600 x 800	No	No	No	Yes	4 GB	Yes	No	No	Unknown
Maker	Model	Intro year	End year	Screen size (inch)	Self-lit	Screen type	Screen model	Weight	Screen pixels	Touch screen	Wireless network	Text-to-speech	Folders	Internal storage	Micro SDHC	Web browser	Library DRM compatible	USB peripherals

== File format support ==
See Comparison of e-book formats for details on the file formats.

The most notable formats are:

- .epub is a free and open e-book standard used by most e-readers.
- .azw is Amazon's first proprietary e-book file format used in Kindles.

Maker	Model	Number	E-Books																				Images					Audio/Video						
Maker	Model	Number	.azw	.cbr	.cbz	.chm	.djvu	.doc	.docx	.epub	.fb2	.html	.lit	.mobi	.opf	.pdb	.pdf	.pdg	.rtf	.tcr	.tr3	.txt	.bmp	.gif	.jpg	.png	.tiff	.avi	.flv	.m4v	.mov	.mp3	.mpeg1/2/4	.wmv
Aluratek	Liber Touch	09	No	No	No	No	No	No	Unknown	Yes	Partial (non-DRM only)	No	No	No	No	No	Yes	No	Partial (non-DRM only)	No	No	Yes	Unknown	Yes	Yes	Yes	Unknown	Partial (non-DRM only)	Partial (non-DRM only)	Partial (non-DRM only)	Partial (non-DRM only)	Yes	Partial (non-DRM only)	No
Aluratek	Libre Air	11	No	No	No	No	No	No	Unknown	Yes	Partial (non-DRM only)	Yes	No	Partial (non-DRM only)	No	No	Yes	No	Partial (non-DRM only)	No	No	Yes	Unknown	Yes	Yes	Yes	Unknown	No	No	No	No	Yes	No	No
Aluratek	Libre Color eBook Reader	10	No	No	No	No	No	No	Unknown	Yes	Partial (non-DRM only)	Yes	No	No	No	No	Yes	No	Partial (non-DRM only)	No	No	Yes	Unknown	Yes	Yes	Yes	Unknown	Partial (non-DRM only)	Partial (non-DRM only)	Partial (non-DRM only)	Partial (non-DRM only)	Yes	Partial (non-DRM only)	Partial (non-DRM only)
Aluratek	Libre Pro	08	No	No	No	No	No	No	Unknown	Yes	Partial (non-DRM only)	No	No	Partial (non-DRM only)	No	No	Yes	No	No	No	No	Yes	Unknown	Yes	Yes	No	Unknown	No	No	No	No	Yes	No	No
Amazon.com	Kindle 3 Wi-Fi & 3G	12+	Yes	No	Yes	Unknown	No	Yes	Unknown	Partial (via Send to Kindle)	Yes	No	Partial (no DRM)	No	No	Yes	No	Unknown	Unknown	Yes	Yes	Unknown	Unknown	Unknown	Unknown	Unknown	Unknown	Unknown	Unknown	Unknown	Yes	Unknown	Unknown	
Amazon.com	Kindle DX	12	Yes	No	Unknown	Unknown	No	Unknown	Unknown	Partial (via Send to Kindle)	No	Yes	No	Partial (no DRM)	No	No	Yes	No	Unknown	Unknown	Yes	Yes	Unknown	Unknown	Unknown	Unknown	Unknown	Unknown	Unknown	Unknown	Unknown	Yes	Unknown	Unknown
Amazon.com	Kindle 2	12	Yes	No	No	Unknown	No	Unknown	Unknown	Partial (via Send to Kindle)	No	Yes	No	Partial (no DRM)	No	No	Yes	No	Yes	Unknown	Yes	Yes	Unknown	No	Unknown	Unknown	Unknown	Unknown	Unknown	Unknown	Unknown	Yes	Unknown	Unknown
Amazon.com	Kindle	Unknown	Yes	No	Unknown	Unknown	Unknown	No	Unknown	Partial (via Send to Kindle)	No	Yes	No	Partial (no DRM)	No	No	No	No	Yes	Unknown	No	Yes	Unknown	Unknown	Unknown	Unknown	Unknown	Unknown	Unknown	Unknown	Unknown	Yes	Unknown	Unknown
Asus	Eee Reader DR900	Unknown	No	No	Yes	No	No	No	Unknown	Yes	Yes	Yes	No	No	No	No	Yes	No	No	No	No	Yes	Unknown	Yes	Yes	Yes	Unknown	Unknown	Unknown	Unknown	Unknown	Yes	Unknown	Unknown
Barnes & Noble	Barnes & Noble Nook Color	15+	No	Unknown	Unknown	No	No	Yes	Unknown	Yes	No	Yes	No	No	No	Yes	Yes	No	No	No	No	Yes	Unknown	Unknown	Unknown	Unknown	Unknown	Unknown	Unknown	Unknown	Unknown	Yes	Unknown	Unknown
Barnes & Noble	Nook	04	No	Unknown	Unknown	No	No	No	No	Yes	No	No	No	No	No	Yes	Yes	No	No	No	No	No	Unknown	Unknown	Unknown	Unknown	Unknown	Unknown	Unknown	Unknown	Unknown	Yes	Unknown	Unknown
Barnes & Noble	Nook Simple Touch	08	No	Unknown	Unknown	No	No	No	No	Yes	No	Unknown	No	No	No	Yes	Yes	No	No	No	No	No	Yes	Yes	Yes	Yes	Unknown	Unknown	Unknown	Unknown	Unknown	No	Unknown	Unknown
Bookeen	Cybook Orizon	08	No	Unknown	Unknown	No	No	No	Unknown	Yes	Yes	Yes	No	No	No	No	Yes	No	No	No	No	Yes	Unknown	Yes	Yes	Yes	Unknown	Unknown	Unknown	Unknown	Unknown	No	Unknown	Unknown
Bookeen	Cybook Opus	06	No	Unknown	Unknown	No	No	Yes	Unknown	Yes	Yes	Yes	No	Yes	No	No	Yes	No	Unknown	Unknown	No	Yes	Unknown	Unknown	Unknown	Unknown	Unknown	Unknown	Unknown	Unknown	Unknown	No	Unknown	Unknown
Bookeen	Cybook Gen3	07	No	Unknown	Unknown	Unknown	No	Unknown	Unknown	Yes	Yes	Yes	No	Yes	No	No	Yes	No	Unknown	Unknown	No	Yes	Unknown	Unknown	Unknown	Unknown	Unknown	Unknown	Unknown	Unknown	Unknown	Yes	Unknown	Unknown
bq	Movistar ebook bq	14	No	No	No	Yes	Yes	No	No	Yes	Yes	Yes	No	No	No	No	Yes	No	Yes	No	No	Yes	Yes	Yes	Yes	Yes	No	No	No	No	No	Yes	No	No
Condor Technology	eGriver IDEO	18	No	Unknown	Unknown	Unknown	Yes	Unknown	Unknown	Yes	No	Yes	No	Yes	Yes	Yes	Yes	No	Unknown	Unknown	No	Yes	Unknown	Unknown	Unknown	Unknown	Unknown	Unknown	Unknown	Unknown	Unknown	Yes	Unknown	Unknown
Condor Technology Associates	eGriver Touch	08	No	Unknown	Unknown	Unknown	Yes	Unknown	Unknown	Yes	No	Yes	No	Yes	Yes	Yes	Yes	No	Unknown	Unknown	No	Yes	Unknown	Unknown	Unknown	Unknown	Unknown	Unknown	Unknown	Unknown	Unknown	Yes	Unknown	Unknown
EBS Technology	Agebook+6	12	No	Unknown	Unknown	Unknown	No	Unknown	Unknown	Yes	No	Yes	No	No	Yes	No	Yes	No	Unknown	Unknown	No	Yes	Unknown	Unknown	Unknown	Unknown	Unknown	Unknown	Unknown	Unknown	Unknown	Yes	Unknown	Unknown
Ectaco	JetBook Color	Unknown	Unknown	Unknown	Unknown	Unknown	Yes	Unknown	Unknown	Yes	Yes	Unknown	Unknown	Yes	Unknown	Unknown	Yes	Unknown	Yes	Unknown	Unknown	Yes	Yes	Yes	Yes	Yes	Unknown	Unknown	Unknown	Unknown	Unknown	Yes	Unknown	Unknown
Elonex	Elonex ebook	Unknown	Unknown	Unknown	Unknown	Unknown	Unknown	Unknown	Unknown	Yes	Unknown	Yes	Unknown	Unknown	Unknown	Unknown	Yes	Unknown	Unknown	Unknown	Unknown	Yes	Unknown	Unknown	Unknown	Unknown	Unknown	Unknown	Unknown	Unknown	Unknown	Unknown	Unknown	Unknown
Endless ideas	BeBook&One (Hanlin V3 clone)	23	No	Unknown	Unknown	Unknown	Yes	Unknown	Unknown	Yes	Yes	Yes	Yes	Yes	No	No	Yes	No	Unknown	Unknown	No	Yes	Unknown	Unknown	Unknown	Unknown	Unknown	Unknown	Unknown	Unknown	Unknown	Yes	Unknown	Unknown
Endless ideas	BeBook&Mini (Hanlin V5 clone)	23	No	Unknown	Unknown	Unknown	Yes	Unknown	Unknown	Yes	Yes	Yes	Yes	Yes	No	No	Yes	No	Unknown	Unknown	No	Yes	Unknown	Unknown	Unknown	Unknown	Unknown	Unknown	Unknown	Unknown	Unknown	Yes	Unknown	Unknown
Foxit&Corp.	eSlick	Unknown	Unknown	Unknown	Unknown	Unknown	Unknown	Unknown	Unknown	Yes	Unknown	Unknown	Unknown	Unknown	Unknown	Yes	Yes	Unknown	Unknown	Unknown	Unknown	Yes	Unknown	Unknown	Unknown	Unknown	Unknown	Unknown	Unknown	Unknown	Unknown	Yes	Unknown	Unknown
Hanvon	WISEreader N516	Unknown	Unknown	Unknown	Unknown	No	Unknown	No	Unknown	Yes	No	Yes	No	No	No	No	Yes	No	Unknown	Unknown	No	Yes	Unknown	Unknown	Unknown	Unknown	Unknown	Unknown	Unknown	Unknown	Unknown	Yes	Unknown	Unknown
Hanvon	WISEreader N518 19	Unknown	Unknown	Unknown	Unknown	No	Unknown	No	Unknown	Yes	No	Yes	No	No	No	No	Yes	No	Unknown	Unknown	No	Yes	Unknown	Unknown	Unknown	Unknown	Unknown	Unknown	Unknown	Unknown	Unknown	Yes	Unknown	Unknown
Hanvon	WISEreader N520	Unknown	Unknown	Unknown	Unknown	No	Unknown	No	Unknown	Yes	No	Yes	No	No	No	No	Yes	No	Unknown	Unknown	No	Yes	Unknown	Unknown	Unknown	Unknown	Unknown	Unknown	Unknown	Unknown	Unknown	Yes	Unknown	Unknown
Hanvon	WISEreader N526	Unknown	Unknown	Unknown	Unknown	No	Unknown	No	Unknown	Yes	No	Yes	No	No	No	No	Yes	No	Unknown	Unknown	No	Yes	Unknown	Unknown	Unknown	Unknown	Unknown	Unknown	Unknown	Unknown	Unknown	Yes	Unknown	Unknown
Interead	COOL-ER	Unknown	Unknown	Unknown	Unknown	Unknown	Unknown	Unknown	Unknown	Yes	Yes	Yes	Unknown	Unknown	Unknown	Unknown	Yes	Unknown	Unknown	Unknown	Unknown	Yes	Unknown	Unknown	Unknown	Unknown	Unknown	Unknown	Unknown	Unknown	Unknown	Yes	Unknown	Unknown
iPapyrus Inc.	iPapyrus 6	Unknown	Unknown	Unknown	Unknown	Unknown	Unknown	Unknown	Unknown	Yes	Unknown	Unknown	Unknown	Unknown	Unknown	Unknown	Yes	Unknown	Unknown	Unknown	Unknown	Unknown	Unknown	Unknown	Unknown	Unknown	Unknown	Unknown	Unknown	Unknown	Unknown	Unknown	Unknown	Unknown
iRex Technologies	Digital Reader 800	Unknown	Unknown	Unknown	Unknown	Unknown	Unknown	Unknown	Unknown	Yes	Unknown	Unknown	Unknown	Unknown	Unknown	Unknown	Yes	Unknown	Unknown	Unknown	Unknown	Yes	Unknown	Unknown	Unknown	Unknown	Unknown	Unknown	Unknown	Unknown	Unknown	Unknown	Unknown	Unknown
iRex Technologies	Digital Reader 1000	09	Unknown	Unknown	Unknown	Unknown	Unknown	Unknown	Unknown	Yes	Unknown	Yes	Unknown	Unknown	Unknown	Unknown	Yes	Unknown	Unknown	Unknown	Unknown	Yes	Unknown	Unknown	Unknown	Unknown	Unknown	Unknown	Unknown	Unknown	Unknown	Unknown	Unknown	Unknown
iRex Technologies	iLiad	Unknown	Unknown	Unknown	Unknown	Unknown	Unknown	Unknown	Unknown	Yes	Unknown	Unknown	Unknown	Yes	Unknown	Unknown	Yes	Unknown	Unknown	Unknown	Unknown	Yes	Unknown	Unknown	Unknown	Unknown	Unknown	Unknown	Unknown	Unknown	Unknown	Unknown	Unknown	Unknown
Iriver	Story	Unknown	Unknown	Unknown	Unknown	No	Unknown	Yes	Unknown	Yes	Unknown	Yes	No	Unknown	Unknown	Unknown	Yes	Unknown	Unknown	Unknown	Unknown	Yes	Unknown	Unknown	Unknown	Unknown	Unknown	Unknown	Unknown	Unknown	Unknown	Yes	Unknown	Unknown
Iriver	IRiver Story HD	15	No	No	Yes	No	Yes	Yes	Yes	Yes	Yes	Yes	No	No	Unknown	No	Yes	Unknown	No	Unknown	Unknown	Yes	Yes	Yes	Yes	Yes	No	No	No	No	No	No	No	No
italica GmbH	Paperback 1.0	06	No	Unknown	Unknown	Unknown	No	Unknown	Unknown	Yes	No	Yes	No	Yes	No	No	Yes	No	Unknown	Unknown	No	Yes	Unknown	Unknown	Unknown	Unknown	Unknown	Unknown	Unknown	Unknown	Unknown	Yes	Unknown	Unknown
JinKe	Hanlin V2	Unknown	Unknown	Unknown	Unknown	Unknown	Unknown	Yes	Unknown	Yes	Unknown	Yes	Yes	Yes	Unknown	Unknown	Yes	Unknown	Unknown	Unknown	Unknown	Yes	Unknown	Unknown	Unknown	Unknown	Unknown	Unknown	Unknown	Unknown	Unknown	Yes	Unknown	Unknown
JinKe	Hanlin V3	19	Unknown	Unknown	Unknown	Unknown	Yes	Unknown	Unknown	Yes	Yes	Yes	Yes	Yes	Unknown	Unknown	Yes	Unknown	Unknown	Unknown	Unknown	Yes	Unknown	Unknown	Unknown	Unknown	Unknown	Unknown	Unknown	Unknown	Unknown	Yes	Unknown	Unknown
JinKe	Hanlin V5	Unknown	Unknown	Unknown	Unknown	Unknown	Unknown	Yes	Unknown	Yes	Yes	Yes	Yes	Yes	Unknown	Unknown	Yes	Unknown	Unknown	Unknown	Unknown	Yes	Unknown	Unknown	Unknown	Unknown	Unknown	Unknown	Unknown	Unknown	Unknown	Yes	Unknown	Unknown
JinKe	Hanlin V6.0	Unknown	Unknown	Unknown	Unknown	Unknown	Yes	Yes	Unknown	Yes	Yes	Yes	Yes	Yes	Unknown	Unknown	Yes	Unknown	Yes	Unknown	Unknown	Yes	Unknown	Unknown	Unknown	Unknown	Unknown	Unknown	Unknown	Unknown	Unknown	Yes	Unknown	Unknown
Kobo	eReader	03	No	Unknown	Unknown	No	No	No	Unknown	Yes	No	No	No	No	No	No	Yes	No	No	No	No	No	Unknown	Unknown	Unknown	Unknown	Unknown	Unknown	Unknown	Unknown	Unknown	No	Unknown	Unknown
Kobo	eReader WiFi	09	No	Yes	Yes	No	No	No	Unknown	Yes	No	Yes	No	No	No	No	Yes	No	No	No	No	Yes	Unknown	Yes	Yes	Yes	Unknown	Unknown	Unknown	Unknown	Unknown	No	Unknown	Unknown
Kobo	eReader Touch	14	No	Yes	Yes	No	No	No	Yes	Yes	No	Yes	No	Partial (raw markup)	No	No	Yes	No	No	No	No	Yes	No	Yes	Yes	Yes	Yes	Unknown	Unknown	Unknown	Unknown	No	Unknown	Unknown
Kogan.com	Kogan eBook Reader	16	No	Unknown	Unknown	Unknown	Yes	Unknown	Unknown	Yes	No	Yes	No	Yes	Yes	Yes	Yes	No	Unknown	Unknown	No	Yes	Unknown	Unknown	Unknown	Unknown	Unknown	Unknown	Unknown	Unknown	Unknown	Yes	Unknown	Unknown
Kolporter	eClicto	Unknown	Unknown	Unknown	Unknown	No	No	Unknown	Unknown	Yes	No	Yes	No	No	No	No	Yes	No	Unknown	Unknown	No	No	Unknown	Unknown	Unknown	Unknown	Unknown	Unknown	Unknown	Unknown	Unknown	Yes	Unknown	Unknown
Manta	Ebook04	15	Unknown	Unknown	Unknown	Yes	Unknown	Unknown	Unknown	Yes	Yes	Yes	Unknown	Yes	Unknown	Yes	Yes	Unknown	Yes	Unknown	Unknown	Yes	Yes	Yes	Yes	Yes	Unknown	No	No	No	No	Yes	No	Yes
Newsmy	e6210	Unknown	No	No	No	No	No	No	No	Yes	Yes	Yes	No	No	No	No	Yes	No	No	No	No	Yes	Yes	Yes	Yes	Yes	No	No	No	No	No	Yes	No	No
Onyx Inc.	Boox&A60/60S	22	No	Yes	Yes	Yes	Yes	Yes	Yes	Yes	Yes	Yes	No	Partial (no DRM)	No	Yes	Yes	No	Yes	No	No	Yes	Yes	Yes	Yes	Yes	Yes	No	No	No	No	Yes	No	Yes
Onyx Inc.	Boox X60/60S	22	No	No	No	Yes	Yes	Yes	Yes	Yes	Yes	Yes	No	Partial (no DRM)	No	Yes	Yes	No	Yes	No	No	Yes	Yes	Yes	Yes	No	Yes	No	No	No	No	Yes	No	No
Onyx Inc.	Boox M90/90S	22	No	Yes	Yes	Yes	Yes	Yes	Yes	Yes	Yes	Yes	No	Partial (no DRM)	No	Yes	Yes	No	Yes	No	No	Yes	Yes	Yes	Yes	Yes	Yes	No	No	No	No	Yes	No	Yes
Onyx Inc.	Boox M92/92s	22	No	Yes	Yes	Yes	Yes	Yes	Yes	Yes	Yes	Yes	No	Partial (no DRM)	No	Yes	Yes	No	Yes	No	No	Yes	Yes	Yes	Yes	Yes	Yes	No	No	No	No	Yes	No	Yes
Onyx Inc.	Boox M96	26+	No	Yes	Yes	Yes	Yes	Yes	Yes	Yes	Yes	Yes	No	Partial (no DRM)	No	Yes	Yes	No	Yes	No	No	Yes	Yes	Yes	Yes	Yes	Yes	Yes	Yes	Yes	Yes	Yes	Yes	Yes
Onyx Inc.	BOOX I62	22	No	Yes	Yes	Yes	Yes	Yes	Yes	Yes	Yes	Yes	No	Partial (no DRM)	No	Yes	Yes	No	Yes	No	No	Yes	Yes	Yes	Yes	Yes	Yes	No	No	No	No	Yes	No	Yes
Onyx Inc.	BOOX I62HD	22	No	Yes	Yes	Yes	Yes	Yes	Yes	Yes	Yes	Yes	No	Partial (no DRM)	No	Yes	Yes	No	Yes	No	No	Yes	Yes	Yes	Yes	Yes	Yes	No	No	No	No	Yes	No	Yes
Onyx Inc.	BOOX I62ML	22	No	Yes	Yes	Yes	Yes	Yes	Yes	Yes	Yes	Yes	No	Partial (no DRM)	No	Yes	Yes	No	Yes	No	No	Yes	Yes	Yes	Yes	Yes	Yes	No	No	No	No	Yes	No	Yes
PocketBook	PocketBook 360 Plus	18	No	Unknown	Unknown	Yes	Yes	Yes	Yes	Yes	Yes	Yes	No	Yes	No	Unknown	Yes	No	Yes	Yes	No	Yes	Yes	Unknown	Yes	Yes	Yes	Unknown	Unknown	Unknown	Unknown	Yes	Unknown	Unknown
PocketBook	PocketBook Pro 602	18	No	Unknown	Unknown	Yes	Yes	Yes	Yes	Yes	Yes	Yes	No	Yes	No	Unknown	Yes	No	Yes	Yes	No	Yes	Yes	Unknown	Yes	Yes	Yes	Unknown	Unknown	Unknown	Unknown	Yes	Unknown	Unknown
PocketBook	PocketBook Pro 603	18	No	Unknown	Unknown	Yes	Yes	Yes	Yes	Yes	Yes	Yes	No	Yes	No	Unknown	Yes	No	Yes	Yes	No	Yes	Yes	Unknown	Yes	Yes	Yes	Unknown	Unknown	Unknown	Unknown	Yes	Unknown	Unknown
PocketBook	PocketBook Pro 902	18	No	Unknown	Unknown	Yes	Yes	Yes	Yes	Yes	Yes	Yes	No	Yes	No	Unknown	Yes	No	Yes	Yes	No	Yes	Yes	Unknown	Yes	Yes	Yes	Unknown	Unknown	Unknown	Unknown	Yes	Unknown	Unknown
PocketBook	PocketBook Pro 903	18	No	Unknown	Unknown	Yes	Yes	Yes	Yes	Yes	Yes	Yes	No	Yes	No	Unknown	Yes	No	Yes	Yes	No	Yes	Yes	Unknown	Yes	Yes	Yes	Unknown	Unknown	Unknown	Unknown	Yes	Unknown	Unknown
Samsung	Papyrus	03	No	No	No	No	No	Yes	No	No	No	No	No	No	No	No	Yes	No	No	No	No	No	No	No	No	No	No	No	No	No	No	Yes	No	No
Samsung	E6	Unknown	No	Unknown	Unknown	No	No	Yes	Unknown	Yes	No	No	No	No	No	No	Yes	No	No	No	No	Yes	Unknown	Unknown	Unknown	Unknown	Unknown	Unknown	Unknown	Unknown	Unknown	Yes	Unknown	Unknown
Sony	DPT-S1	01	No	No	No	No	No	No	No	No	No	No	No	No	No	No	Yes	No	No	No	No	No	No	No	No	No	No	No	No	No	No	No	No	No
Sony	Librié	Unknown	Unknown	Unknown	Unknown	No	Unknown	No	Unknown	No	No	No	No	No	No	No	No	No	Unknown	Unknown	Yes	No	Unknown	Unknown	Unknown	Unknown	Unknown	Unknown	Unknown	Unknown	Unknown	No	Unknown	Unknown
Sony	Reader Pocket Edition PRS-300	06	No	Unknown	Unknown	Unknown	No	Unknown	Unknown	Yes	No	Yes	No	No	No	No	Yes	No	Yes	Unknown	No	Yes	Unknown	Unknown	Unknown	Unknown	Unknown	Unknown	Unknown	Unknown	Unknown	No	Unknown	Unknown
Sony	Reader PRS-500	09	No	Unknown	Unknown	No	No	No	Unknown	Yes	No	No	No	No	No	No	Yes	No	Yes	No	No	Yes	Unknown	Unknown	Unknown	Unknown	Unknown	Unknown	Unknown	Unknown	Unknown	Yes	Unknown	Unknown
Sony	Reader PRS-505	Unknown	Unknown	Unknown	Unknown	Unknown	Unknown	Unknown	Unknown	Yes	No	No	Yes	Yes	Unknown	Unknown	Yes	Unknown	Yes	Unknown	Unknown	Yes	Unknown	Unknown	Unknown	Unknown	Unknown	Unknown	Unknown	Unknown	Unknown	Yes	Unknown	Unknown
Sony	Reader Touch Edition PRS-600	12	No	Unknown	Unknown	Unknown	No	Unknown	Unknown	Yes	No	No	No	No	No	No	Yes	No	Yes	Unknown	No	Yes	Yes	Yes	Yes	Yes	Unknown	Unknown	Unknown	Unknown	Unknown	Yes	Unknown	Unknown
Sony	Reader PRS-700	Unknown	Unknown	Unknown	Unknown	Unknown	Unknown	Unknown	Unknown	Yes	No	Unknown	Unknown	Unknown	Unknown	Unknown	Yes	Unknown	Unknown	Unknown	Unknown	Yes	Unknown	Unknown	Unknown	Unknown	Unknown	Unknown	Unknown	Unknown	Unknown	Yes	Unknown	Unknown
Sony	Reader Daily Edition PRS-900	11	No	Unknown	Unknown	Unknown	No	Unknown	Unknown	Yes	No	Yes	No	No	No	No	Yes	No	Unknown	Unknown	No	Yes	Unknown	Unknown	Unknown	Unknown	Unknown	Unknown	Unknown	Unknown	Unknown	Yes	Unknown	Unknown
Spring Design	Alex eReader	05	No	Unknown	Unknown	Unknown	No	Unknown	Unknown	Yes	No	Yes	No	No	No	No	Yes	No	Unknown	Unknown	No	Yes	Unknown	Unknown	Unknown	Unknown	Unknown	Unknown	Unknown	Unknown	Unknown	Yes	Unknown	Unknown
Stereo International Enterprise	ES600	08	No	Unknown	Unknown	Unknown	Yes	Unknown	Unknown	Yes	No	Yes	No	Yes	Yes	Yes	Yes	No	Unknown	Unknown	No	Yes	Unknown	Unknown	Unknown	Unknown	Unknown	Unknown	Unknown	Unknown	Unknown	Yes	Unknown	Unknown
TrekStor	eBook Reader 3.0	08	No	No	No	No	No	No	No	Yes	Yes	No	No	No	No	No	Yes	No	Partial (only from FileMgr	No	No	Yes	Yes	Yes	Yes	No	No	No	No	No	No	Yes	No	No
Velocity Micro	Cruz Reader	14+	No	Unknown	Unknown	Unknown	No	Unknown	Unknown	Yes	No	Yes	No	No	No	Yes	Yes	No	Unknown	Unknown	No	Yes	Unknown	Unknown	Unknown	Unknown	Unknown	Unknown	Unknown	Unknown	Unknown	Yes	Unknown	Unknown
Velocity Micro	Cruz Tablet T103	14+	No	Unknown	Unknown	Unknown	No	Unknown	Unknown	Yes	No	Yes	No	No	No	Yes	Yes	No	Unknown	Unknown	No	Yes	Unknown	Unknown	Unknown	Unknown	Unknown	Unknown	Unknown	Unknown	Unknown	Yes	Unknown	Unknown
Velocity Micro	Cruz Tablet T301	14+	Yes	Unknown	Unknown	Unknown	No	Unknown	Unknown	Yes	No	Yes	No	No	No	Yes	Yes	No	Unknown	Unknown	No	Yes	Unknown	Unknown	Unknown	Unknown	Unknown	Unknown	Unknown	Unknown	Unknown	Yes	Unknown	Unknown
Wolder Electronics	Boox-S	14	No	Unknown	Unknown	Unknown	No	Unknown	Unknown	Yes	Unknown	Yes	No	Partial (no DRM)	Unknown	No	Yes	Unknown	Unknown	Unknown	Unknown	Yes	Unknown	Unknown	Unknown	Unknown	Unknown	Unknown	Unknown	Unknown	Unknown	Yes	Unknown	Unknown
Maker	Model	Number	E-books																				Images					Audio/Video						
Maker	Model	Number	.azw	.cbr	.cbz	.chm	.djvu	.doc	.docx	.epub	.fb2	.html	.lit	.mobi	.opf	.pdb	.pdf	.pdg	.rtf	.tcr	.tr3	.txt	.bmp	.gif	.jpg	.png	.tiff	.avi	.flv	.m4v	.mov	.mp3	.mpeg1/2/4	.wmv

This list is missing many of the 1st and 2nd generation e-reader devices from the 1990s to 2005.

This list could be expanded by adding Unicode support information for e-readers.

== Other mobile text viewers ==
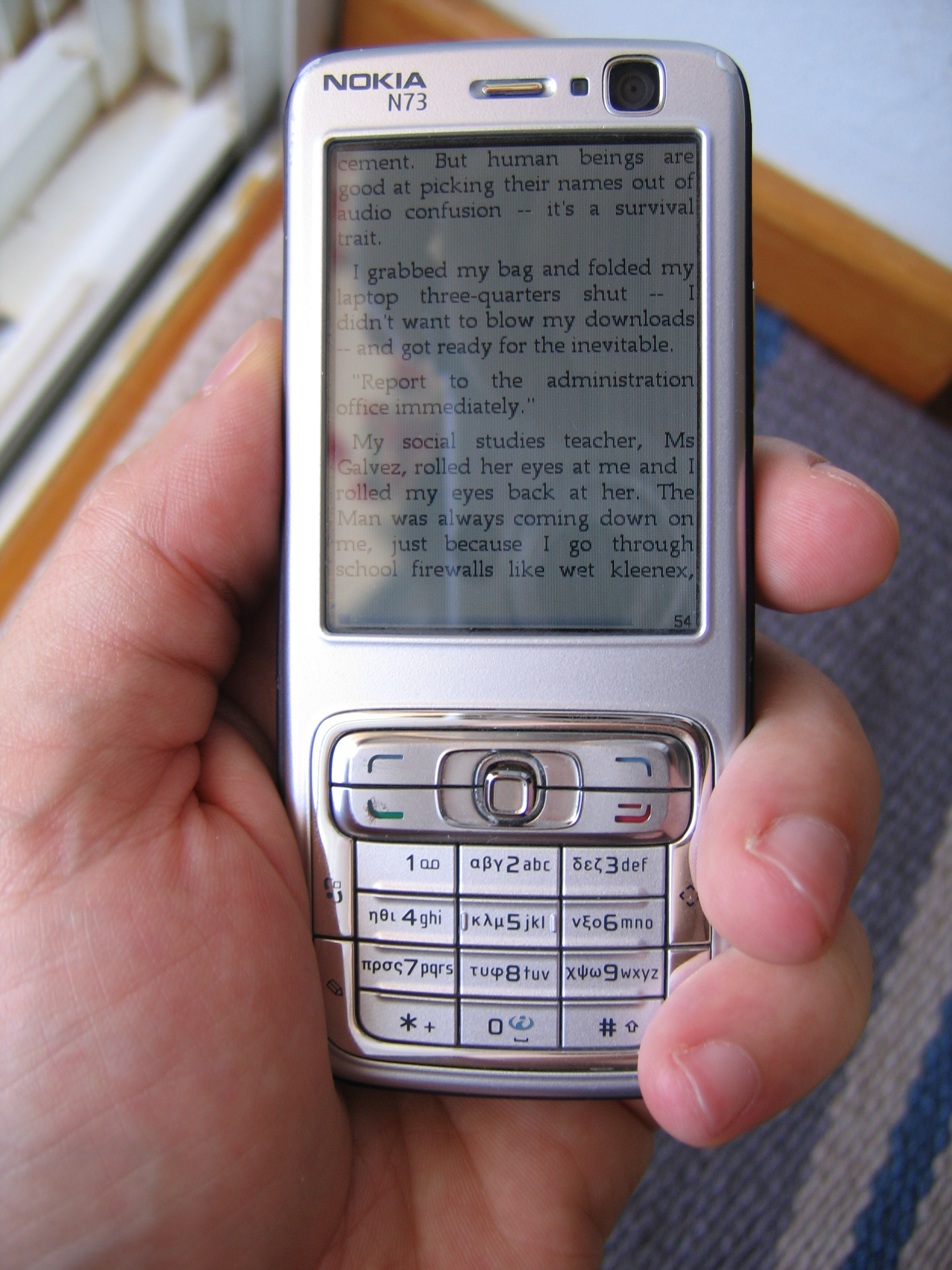
A Symbian OS smartphone used as an e-book reader

- All modern (Windows Mobile, iOS, Android, BlackBerry, Linux) smartphones, tablets and other generic computing devices have e-book reading software.
- Some portable multimedia players and older phones include a text viewer, e.g. several Cowon players, including the Cowon D2 and the iAUDIO U3 and Mobipocket Reader for Symbian OS. Palm OS based devices and smartphones are also usable for reading books. Palm OS supports PalmDoc, iSilo, Mobipocket reader, PDF, HTML conversion, text format, Handstory, TealDoc among many other software titles, and word processing.

== See also ==
- Comparison of tablet computers
- Dedicated ebook devices – Wikipedia category listing e-readers with their articles
- Comparison of ebook formats – includes both device and software formats
- Comparison of Android e-reader software – includes software e-readers for Android devices
- Comparison of iOS e-reader software – includes software e-readers for iOS devices
