= EClicto =

eClicto
- Manufacturer: Kolporter
- Type: E-book reader
- Released: December 10th, 2009
- Operating system: Linux-2.6.10
- Storage: (total/user available) 512 MB/200 MB internal flash memory, up to 4 GB SD card
- Display: 6 in diagonal, 3.6 in (91 mm) × 4.8 in (122 mm), 600 × 800 pixels or 0.48 megapixels, 166 ppi density, 4-level grayscale electronic paper
- Input: USB 2.0 port (micro-B connector), SD card , 2.5 mm stereo headphone jack, AC power adapter jack
- Connectivity: none
- Power: 1000 mAh lithium polymer
- Dimensions: 7.4 × 4.6 × 0.33 in (188 × 118 × 8.5 mm)
- Weight: 174 g (6.1 oz)

eClicto is the first Polish e-book Reader, specially designed for reading e-books, listening to MP3 music or audio-books. eClicto is also a name of the store with e-books in Polish.

== Release ==
It is produced by the Polish company Kolporter Info SA. eClicto was first released on December 10, 2009 (with 100 free e-books) retailing for 899 PLN (about US$300). It supports ePub, pdf and txt files.

== Models ==
There are a few models of e-book readers distributed in Poland, including iLiad and Cybook. A problem affecting the e-book market in Poland is that there is a lack of Polish-language books available in e-reader friendly formats like ePub. The eClicto project is seeking to change that.

== See also ==
- Comparison of e-book readers
- Comparison of tablet computers
