= Krzysztof Klicki =

Polish businessman

- Born: 1962 (age 63–64)
- Occupation: Businessman
- Known for: Owner of Kolporter Holding

Krzysztof Klicki (born 1962) is a Polish businessman, the founder and former president of Kolporter Holding, a company specialising in fast-moving consumer goods. He owns all of Kolporter's shares, the largest private distributor of the press (with more than 70 percent of the media market).

== Kolporter ==
He started Kolporter after the free market transformation in Poland, selling newspapers - in particular Gazeta Wyborcza - which he collected from Warsaw overnight and sold in Kielce the next day with his father (the name Kolporter means "distributor" in Polish). Now there are over a dozen companies in several sectors of the Polish market that are a part of Kolporter Holding S.A. In 2004, the Kolporter Group recorded about 2.14 billion PLN of revenue and 19 million PLN net profit. As of July 2010, Krzysztof Klicki was one of the 100 richest Poles (in 22nd position) with commercial assets of around 900 million PLN.

== Ownership of Korona Kielce ==
Between 2002 and 2008, Klicki was a part-owner of the Korona Kielce football club. During that period, Korona were promoted from the third to first division of Polish football and reached the Polish Cup final in 2007. In late March 2008, the Central Anticorruption Bureau arrested six individuals tied to Korona, who were involved in the 2003–2005 match-fixing scandal, including Dariusz Wdowczyk, Korona's manager from 2002 to 2004. On 2 April 2008, Klicki announced his withdrawal from Korona.

== Personal life ==
Klicki is a graduate of the Institute of Physics, Higher Pedagogical School in Kielce. He passed his Matura ('A' levels) at the Father Piotr Ściegienny 5th General Secondary School in Kielce. He and his wife (they married right after graduating from high school) have three daughters.
