= Hanlin eReader =

E-book reading device

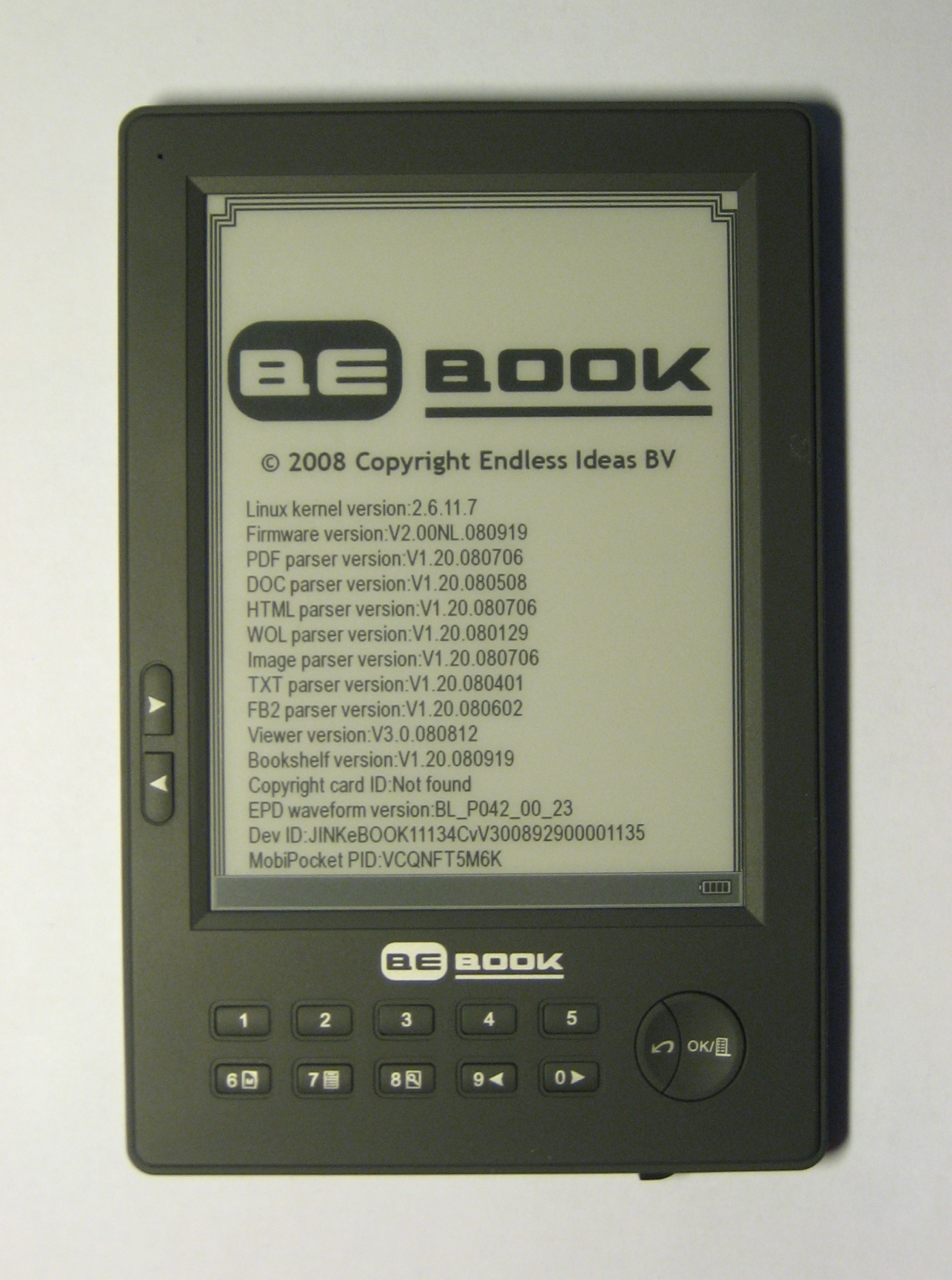
The BeBook e-book reader, a rebranded Hanlin eReader device, displaying the "About" screen

The Hanlin is an e-Reader, an electronic book (e-book) reading device. The Hanlin v3 features a 6" (15 cm), 4-level grayscale electrophoretic display (E Ink material) with a resolution of 600×800 pixels (167 ppi), while the v3+ features a 16-level grayscale display. The Hanlin v5 Mini, features a 5" (15 cm), 8-level grayscale electrophoretic display (E Ink material) with a resolution of 600×800 pixels (200 ppi). The device runs a Linux-based OS.

The device is produced by the JinKe Electronic Company in China and is rebranded by various OEMs. It is marketed under different names including Bebook, Walkbook, lBook, Iscriptum, Papyre, EZ Reader, Koobe, and ECO Reader. It can also be used with JinKe's proprietary WOLF format (file extension .wol).

== Specifications of Hanlin Models ==
=== Hardware ===
- Size: 184 mm × 120.5 mm × 9.9 mm
- Weight: 210 g, battery included (160-gram for BeBook mini)
- Screen: 90 mm × 120 mm (3.54 in × 4.72 in)
- 600×800 pixels / black and white, 4/16 gray-scale 166 dpi for Hanlin v3/v3+ and 8 gray-scale 200 dpi for Hanlin v5
- Daylight readable / No backlight / Portrait and landscape mode
- SDRAM memory: 32 MB for the v3, 64 MB for the v3+/v6
- SD card (supports SDIO) (v3 supports up to 4 GB, v5 supports SDHC up to 16 GB (supports 32 GB unofficially)
- Connectivity: USB 1.1 (client only) for Hanlin v3 and USB 2.0 for Hanlin v3+/v5

=== Software ===
- Operating system: Linux
- Document formats: PDF, TXT, RTF, DOC, HTML Help, FB2, HTML, WOL, DJVU, LIT, EPUB, PPT, Mobipocket.
- Archives support: ZIP, RAR.
- Supported image format: TIFF, JPEG, GIF, BMP, PNG.
- Supported sound format: MP3.

=== Product Version ===
- V Series: V2, V3, V3+, V5, V60, V90
- A Series: A6, A9, A90

== See also ==
- List of e-book readers
