= Onyx Boox =

E-book reader

Boox
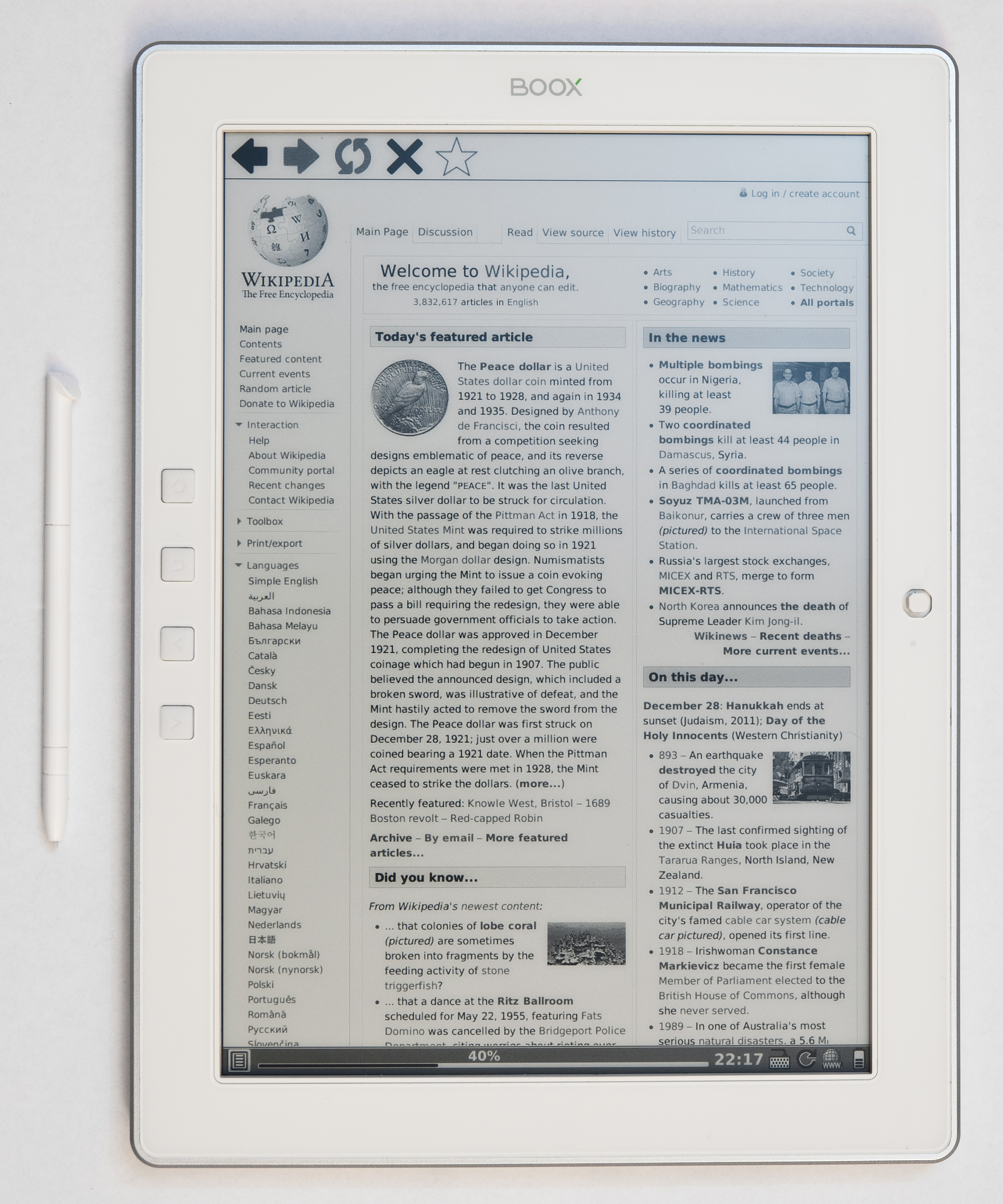
- Onyx Boox M92
- Manufacturer: Onyx International
- Product family: Boox
- Type: E-readers, tablets and monitors
- Operating system: Android
- Display: E Ink
- Website: www.boox.com

Onyx Boox (stylized as BOOX) is a brand of e-ink readers, tablets, and monitors produced by Onyx International Inc, based in China. Since 2013, most non-monitor Boox devices use the Android operating system which allows users to read books across many book sellers, including their own ebook files, and use any other applications available to Android.

== Devices ==
=== i63ML Newton ===
The Onyx Boox i63ML Newton (I63MLP_HD) device is the first eReader with access to Google Play. It has a 1 GHz processor, 512MB DDR and 8 GB internal storage memory. Build on SoC Rockchip RK2906 and Android Gingerbread 2.3.1 (API level 9, NDK 5) Linux kernel 2.6.32.27. It has 6" E-Ink Carta display 1024×758 px (14:1 contrast) with Moonight backlight.

=== i62ML ===
Onyx Boox i62ML (Moon Light) (also called "Firefly", "Angel Glow" or "Aurora" depending on the country it is sold in) is a device with 800 MHz Cortex A8 CPU, 128MB DDR, 4 GB internal memory, a 6-inch E Ink Pearl HD infrared touch screen, with 1024×758 resolution, 16 level grey scale and built in front-light technology called Moon Light.

=== M92 ===
Onyx Boox M92 is a device with a 9.7-inch E Ink Pearl screen with electromagnetic touch, 1200×825 resolution and 16 level grey scale. It supports the Hanvon stylus for touchscreen navigation and note taking. It was released in November 2011.

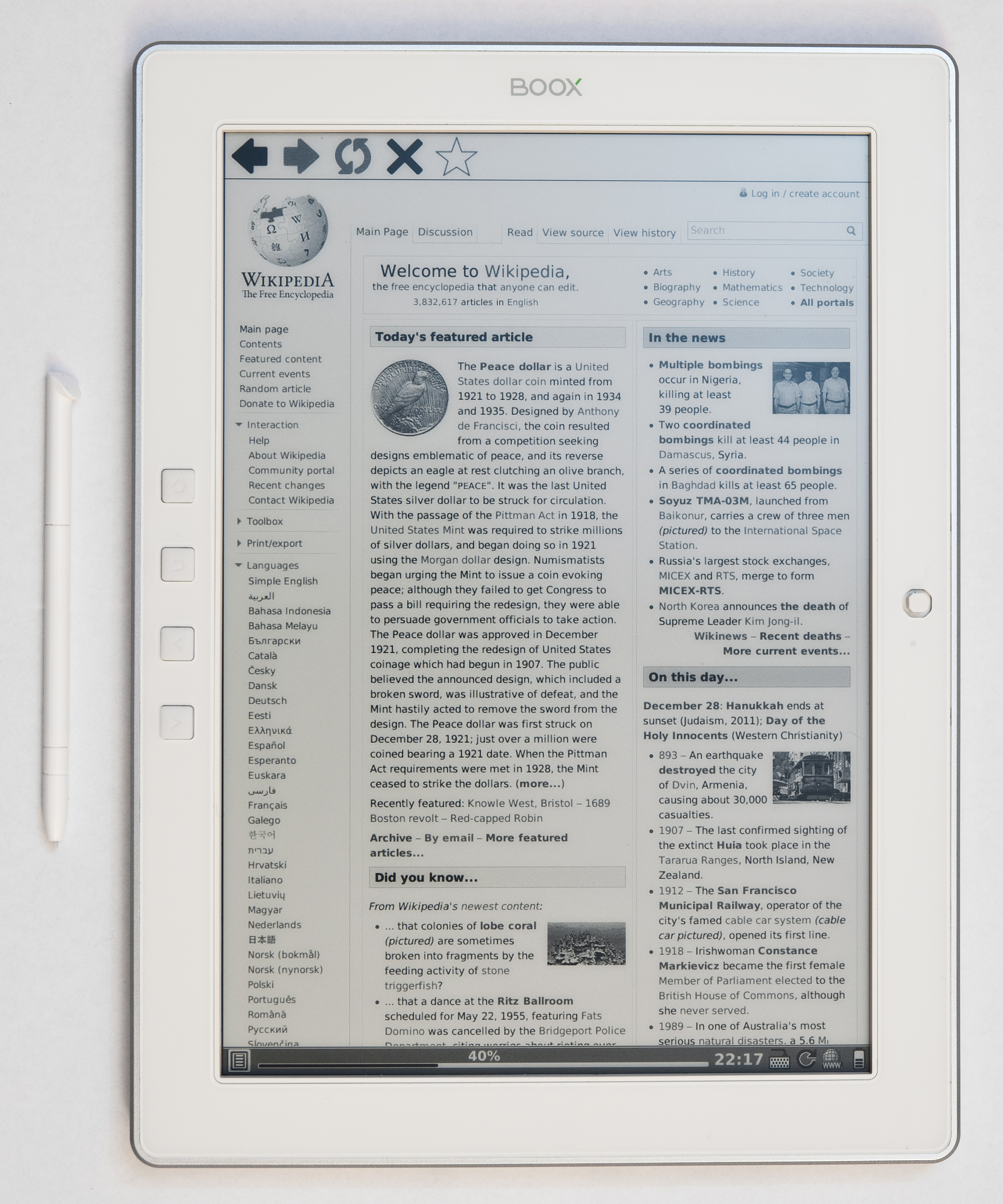
Onyx Boox M92 E-Book-Reader with 9.7" E-Ink EPD display

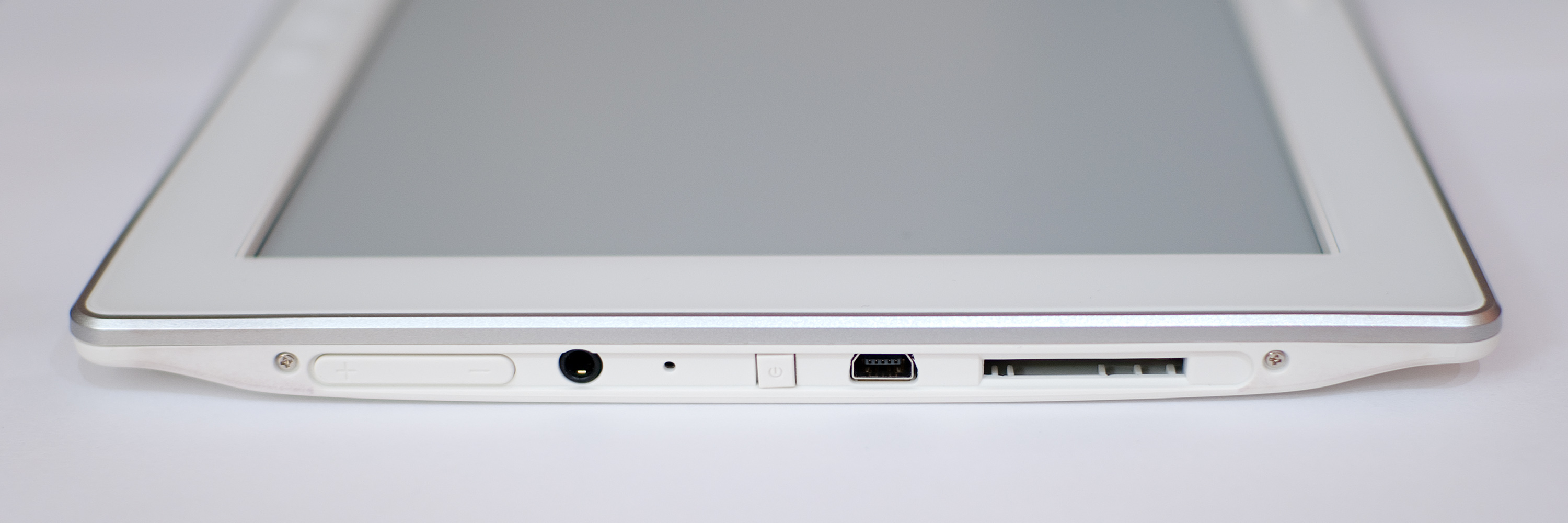
Bottom of the Onyx Boox M92 e-book reader

=== E43 ===
An Android-based (2.3) smart phone and e-reader, the primary screen of which will be a 4.3-inch e-Ink display. The specs indicate it will be a tri-band device and will lack the 850 MHz band that is needed in the USA.

=== C65HD/C65ML ===
The Onyx BOOX C65 is an Android-based (2.3) device with a 6-inch E Ink HD EPD multi-touch capacitive touch screen with 1024×758 pixel resolution at 212 ppi and 16 grey levels. It comes in two versions, the C65HD "Storia" (burgundy) and the C65ML "AfterGlow" (graphite), the latter with a Modern Front-Light system. Specifications for the device include a 1 GHz Cortex A8 CPU, 512 MB RAM, 4 GB flash memory, 802.11 b/g/n WiFi, and a MicroSD card slot. Weight: 186 g (6.6 oz), Size: 170×117×8.7 mm (6.7x4.6x0.3 in).

=== C67ML ===
The Onyx BOOX C67 is an Android-based (4.2) device with a 6-inch E Ink HD EPD multi-touch capacitive touch screen with 1024x758 pixel resolution at 212 ppi and 16 grey levels. It comes in two versions, the C67ML (no Google Play store support) and the C67ML "Afterglow 2". Specifications for the device include a 1 GHz Cortex-A9 dual core cpu, 512 MB RAM, 4 GB flash memory, 802.11 b/g/n WiFi, and a MicroSD card slot. Weight: 186 g (6.6 oz), Size: 171×117×9 mm (6.7×4.6×0.3 in).

=== T68 ===
The Onyx BOOX T68 is an Android 4.0 based e-reader/tablet with 6.8-inch E Ink Pearl HD (1440×1080) screen. It runs on a 1 GHz Freescale i.MX6 ARM Cortex A9 processor. It comes with 512 MB RAM, 4 GB of storage, a microSD card slot, audio jack, wifi, bluetooth, can use Google Play Books and the Amazon Kindle Store and has a text-to-speech capability when a bluetooth speaker is used.

=== i86 ===
The Onyx BOOX i86 is an Android 4.0 based e-reader with 8-inch E Ink Pearl 1600×1200, infrared touchscreen and runs on a 1 GHz Cortex A9 processor. It comes with 512 MB RAM, 4 GB of storage, a microSD card slot, audio jack, wifi, bluetooth.

=== Onyx Boox Max ===
The Onyx Boox Max is an Android 4.0 based e-reader/tablet with a 13.3-inch E Mobius 1200x1600 screen.

The Onyx Boox Max Carta is an Android 4.0 based e-reader/tablet with 13.3-inch E Carta flexible display 1650×2200 screen.

The Onyx Boox Max 2 is an Android 6 based e-reader/tablet with a 13.3-inch E Mobius 1650×2200 screen with 2 GB RAM, 32 GB internal memory, stereo output, microphone, HDMI and USB 2 specifications

The Onyx Boox Max 2 Pro is an Android 6 based e-reader/tablet with a 13.3-inch E Mobius 1650×2200 screen with 4 GB RAM, 64 GB Internal memory, stereo output, microphone, micro HDMI and micro USB specifications

The Onyx Boox Max 3 is an Android 9 based e-reader/tablet with a 13.3-inch E Mobius 1650×2200 screen with 4 GB RAM, 64 GB Internal memory, stereo output, microphone, micro HDMI and USB C specifications

=== Onyx Boox Nova ===
Onyx Boox Nova is a 7.8inch ereader with edge-to-edge glass and a brand new design. Onyx plans to make two different versions, a waterproof one with microUSB port, and standard one with USB-C. It was released in 2018.

=== Onyx Boox Note Pro and Nova Pro ===
After collecting feedback from many customers, Onyx decided to introduce Onyx Boox Note Pro and Boox Nova Pro at CES 2019. The two new models are equipped with pen input via Wacom digitizer and a CTM (warm and cold) frontlight. Onyx Boox Nova Pro and Onyx Boox Note Pro were released later in 2019.

=== Onyx Boox Max Lumi ===
Onyx Boox Max Lumi is the long-awaited 13" ebook reader with integrated frontlight. It is an evolution of the previous Onyx Boox Max 3 with a faster hardware platform and of course the new glowing E-Ink panel. Onyx Boox Max Lumi is available since the end of September 2020.

=== Onyx Boox Poke ===
The Onyx Boox Poke is a Kindle Paperwhite sized (6 inches) ereader. The Onyx Boox Poke 2 Color is the first color ereader that Onyx Boox ever made. The Poke series does not have any pens to take notes with. The earlier version has a sunken screen, but the current (monochrome) Poke 3 has a flush screen.

=== Onyx Boox Tab Ultra and Tab X ===
The Onyx Boox Tab Ultra is a 10.3" note taking device, with an optional keyboard cover. It contains a custom GPU to improve the refresh performance of the e-ink display. The Onyx Boox Tab X is a 13.3" note taking device, which supports a separate Bluetooth keyboard and also uses a custom GPU.

=== Onyx Boox Tiles ===
Onyx introduced the Boox Tiles line of products in 2026, described as a "lifestyle companions and novelties" line of products. The first entry, Boox Picco, differentiates itself primarily on its small form factor.

=== Other Onyx Boox devices ===
After release of the Tab X in 2023, Onyx released the Tab Ultra C, Poke 5, Tab Mini C, Palma, Page, Note Air3 C, Tab Ultra C, Tab Ultra C Pro, and Note Air3. In 2024, Onyx released the Go Color 7, Go 10.3, Note Air4 C, Go 6, Palma 2, and Note Max. For more information on these devices, see the following table.

== Release dates ==
Date	Model	Operating system	CPU	RAM	Storage	Screen Size	Predecessor
2011
November	M92	Linux	—	—	—	9.7" (825×1200) Pearl	
December	i62	Linux	—	—	—	6" (600×800) Pearl	
2012
October	i62ML "Firefly", "AngelGlow" or "Aurora"	Linux	—	—	—	6" (758×1024) Pearl	
2013
September	C65 "Storia" or, "AfterGlow"	Android 2.3	1 GHz Cortex A8	512 MB	4 GB	6" (758×1024) Pearl	i62ML
2014
April	i63ML Newton	Android 2.3.1	—	—	—	6" (1024×758) Carta	
June	T68	Android 4.0	—	—	—	6.8" (1080×1440) Pearl	
June	E43	Android 2.3	—	—	—	4.3" (480×800) Mobius	
July	M96	Android 4.0	Dual-core 1 GHz	512 MB	4 GB + SD card	9.7" (825×1200) Pearl	M92
November	C67ML "AfterGlow 2"	Android 4.2	—	—	—	6" (758×1024) Pearl	
November	i62A	Android 2.3	RockChip 1.0 GHz	512 MB	4 GB	6" (600×800) Pearl	i62
2015
May	i86	Android 4.0	1 GHz Cortex A9	512 MB	4 GB	8" (1200×1600) Pearl	
2016
April	N96	Android 4.04	1 GHz single-core processor	1 GB	16 GB	9.7" (825×1200) Pearl	M96
May	Max	Android 4.04	1 GHz	1 GB	16 GB	13.3" (1600×1200) Mobius	
2017
April	Max Carta	Android 4.4	Freescale 1 GHz	1 GB	16 GB	13.3" (2200×1650) Carta flexible screen	Max
November	Max 2	Android 6	4-core, 1.6 GHz	2 GB	32 GB	13.3" (2200×1650) Carta flexible screen	Max Carta
2018
January	Note	Android 6	Quad-core 1.6 GHz	2 GB	32 GB	10.3" (1872×1404) Carta flexible screen	
est. 2018	Note S	Android 6	Quad-core 1.6 GHz	1 GB	16 GB	9.7" (825x1200) Carta	N96
est. H1.2018	Nova	Android 6	Cortex-A17 1.6 GHz Quad-core	2 GB	32 GB	7.8" (1872×1404) Carta	
November	Poke	Android 4.4	Quad-core 1.2 GHz	1 GB	8 GB	6" (1072×1448) Carta HD	
November	Poke Pro	Android 6	Quad-core 1.6 GHz	2 GB	16 GB	6" (1072×1448) Carta HD	
2019
April	Note Pro	Android 6	Quad-core 1.6 GHz	4 GB	64 GB	10.3" (1872×1404) Carta	Note
April	Nova Pro	Android 6	Cortex-A17 1.6 GHz Quad-core	2 GB	32 GB	7.8" (1872×1404) Carta	Nova
November	Note 2	Android 9	Octa-core 2 GHz	4 GB	64 GB	10.3" (1872×1404) Mobius	Note
September	Max 3	Android 9	Octa-core 2 GHz	4 GB	64 GB	13.3" (2200×1650) Mobius	Max 2
2020
January	Nova 2	Android 9	8-core, 2 GHz	3 GB	32 GB	7.8" (1872×1404) Carta Plus	Nova Pro
April	Poke 2	Android 9	Cortex-A53 2.0 GHz Quad-core	2 GB	32 GB	6" (1448×1072) Carta	Poke
August	Poke 2 Color	Android 9	Octa-core 2 GHz	2 GB	32 GB	6" (1448×1072) Carta	Poke 2
September	Max Lumi	Android 10	Octa-core 2 GHz	4 GB	64 GB	13.3" (2200×1650) Mobius Flexible	Max 3
September	Note Air	Android 10	Octa-core 1.8 GHz	3 GB	32 GB	10.3" (1872×1404) Carta	
November	Note 3	Android 10	Octa-core 1.8 GHz	4 GB	64 GB	10.3" (1872×1404) Mobius	Note 2
November	Nova 3	Android 10	Octa-core 1.8 GHz	3 GB	32 GB	7.8" (1872×1404) Carta	Nova 2
November	Poke 3	Android 10	Octa-core 1.8 GHz	2 GB	32 GB	6" (1448×1072) Carta	Poke 2
2021
March	Nova 3 Color	Android 10	Octa-core 1.8 GHz	3 GB	32 GB	7.8" (1872×1404) Kaleido Plus	Nova 3 / Poke 2 Color
August	Nova Air	Android 10	Octa-core	3 GB	32 GB	7.8" (1872x1404) Carta	Nova 3
October	Note 5	Android 11	QS662 4×2 GHz & 4×1.8 GHz	4 GB	64 GB	10.3" (1872x1404) Mobius Flexible	Note 3
October	Note Air 2	Android 11	QS662 4×2 GHz & 4×1.8 GHz	4 GB	64 GB	10.3" (1872x1404) HD Carta	Note Air
November	Leaf	Android 10	Snapdragon 636 octa-core	2 GB	32 GB	7" (1680×1264) Eink Carta 1200	Leaf
November	Max Lumi 2	Android 11	QS662 4×2 GHz & 4×1.8 GHz	6 GB	128 GB	13.3" (1650×2200) Mobius Carta	Max Lumi
2022
March	Nova Air C	Android 11	Octa-core 2 GHz	3 GB	32 GB	7.8" (468x624, 1404x1872) Kaleido Plus	Nova Air
May	Note Air 2 Plus	Android 11	QS665 4×2 GHz & 4x1.8 GHz	4 GB	64 GB	10.3" (1872x1404) HD Carta	Note Air 2
May	Poke 4/4s	Android 11	Qualcomm QCS2290 (4 × Arm Cortex-A53 2.0GHz)	2 GB	32 GB (4) / 16 GB (4s)	6" (1448×1072) (4) Carta 1000+ /(1024x768) (4s) Carta 1100	Poke 3
June	Poke 4 Lite	Android 11	Qualcomm QCS2290 (4 × Arm Cortex-A53 2.0GHz)	2 GB	16 GB	6" (1024×768) Carta 1100	Poke 3
October	Leaf 2	Android 11	Qualcomm QCS2290 (4 × Arm Cortex-A53 2.0GHz)	2 GB	32 GB	7" (1680×1264) Carta 1200	Leaf
October	Nova Air 2	Android 11	Qualcomm octa-core 662	3 GB	32 GB	7.8" (1872×1404) Carta	Nova Air
October	Tab Ultra	Android 11	Qualcomm octa-core 662	4 GB	128 GB	10.3" (1872×1404) Carta	
2023
January	Tab X	Android 11	Qualcomm octa-core 662	6 GB	128 GB	13.3" (2200×1650) Mobius Carta1250	Max Lumi 2
May	Tab Ultra C	Android 11	Qualcomm octa-core 662	4 GB	128 GB	10.3" (1860×2480) Kaleido 3	Tab Ultra
May	Poke 5	Android 11	Qualcomm QCS2290 (4 × Arm Cortex-A53 2.0GHz)	2 GB	32 GB	6" (1448×1072) Carta	Poke 4 Lite
June	Tab Mini C	Android 11	Qualcomm octa-core 662	4 GB	64 GB	7.8" (1872×1404) Kaleido 3	
July	Palma	Android 11	Qualcomm Octa-core (Estimated Snapdragon 662)	6 GB LPDDR4X	128 GB UFS2.1	6.13" (824×1648; 300 ppi) Carta1200	
July	Page	Android 11	Qualcomm Snapdragon 662 (Octa-core)	3 GB LPDDR4X	32 GB eMMC	7" (1680×1264; 300 ppi) Carta1200	
October	Note Air3 C	Android 12	Qualcomm Snapdragon 680 (2.4 GHz Octa-Core CPU)	4 GB	64 GB	10.3" Kaleido 3	
November	Tab Ultra C Pro	Android 12	Qualcomm Snapdragon 855 (2.8 GHz Octa-core CPU)	6 GB	128 GB	10.3" Kaleido 3	Tab Ultra C
November	Mira Pro	Compatible with Windows, Mac, iOS and Android	N/A	-	-	25.3"	
December	Note Air3	Android 12	Qualcomm Snapdragon 680 (2.4 GHz Octa-Core CPU)	4 GB	64 GB	10.3" Carta 1200	
2024
June	Go Color 7	Android 12	Qualcomm Snapdragon 680 (2.4 GHz Octa-Core CPU)	4 GB	64 GB	7" (1680×1264) Kaleido 3; 4096 colors at 150 dpi	
June	Go 10.3	Android 12	Qualcomm Snapdragon 680 (2.4 GHz Octa-core CPU)	4 GB	64 GB	10.3" (2480×1860) HD Carta 1200	
October	Note Air4 C	Android 13	Qualcomm Snapdragon 690 (2.0GHz Octa-core CPU)	6 GB	64 GB	10.3" (2480×1860) Kaleido 3	Note Air3 C
October	Go 6	Android 11	Qualcomm Snapdragon 662 (2.0GHz Octa-core CPU)	2 GB	32 GB	6" Carta 1300 (300 PPI)	Poke 5
October	Palma 2	Android 13	Qualcomm Snapdragon 690 (2.0 GHz Octa-core CPU)	6 GB	128 GB	6.13" Carta 1200 (300 PPI)	Palma
December	Note Max	Android 13	Qualcomm Snapdragon 855 (2.8GHz Octa-core CPU)	6 GB	128 GB	13.3" Carta 1300 (300 PPI)	Tab X
2025
April	Go Color 7 (Gen II)	Android 13	Qualcomm Snapdragon 680 (2.4 GHz Octa-Core CPU)	4 GB	64 GB	7" (1680×1264) Kaleido 3; 4096 colors at 150 dp	Go Color 7
April	Go 7	Android 13	Qualcomm Snapdragon 690 (2.0 GHz Octa-core CPU)	4 GB	64 GB	7" Carta 1300 Monochrome Screen	
April	Mira Pro (Color Version)	Compatible with Windows, Mac, iOS and Android	N/A	N/A	N/A	23" (3200×1800) Kaleido 3; 4096 colors at 145 dp	Mira Pro
April	Tab X C	Android 13	Qualcomm Snapdragon 855 (2.8GHz Octa-core CPU)	6 GB	128 GB	13.3" (3200×2400) Kaleido 3	Tab X
October	Palma 2 Pro	Android 15	Qualcomm Snapdragon 690 (2.0 GHz Octa-core CPU)	8 GB	128 GB	6.13" Kaleido 3 (300 PPI)	Palma 2
October	Note Air5 C	Android 15	Qualcomm Snapdragon 690 (2.0GHz Octa-core CPU)	6 GB	64 GB	10.3" (2480×1860) Kaleido 3	Note Air4 C
2026
March	Go 10.3 (Gen II)	Android 15	Qualcomm Snapdragon 690 (2.0GHz Octa-core CPU)	4 GB	64 GB	10.3" (2480×1860) HD ePaper glass screen	Go 10.3
June	Go 6 (Gen II)	Android 11	Qualcomm Snapdragon 662 (2.0GHz Octa-core CPU)	3 GB	32 GB	6" Carta 1300 (1448x1072)	Go 6
September	Note Air6 C	Android 16	Qualcomm Dragonwing Q-6690 (2.9GHz Octa-core CPU)	6 GB	64 GB	10.3" (2480x1860) Kaleido 3	Note Air5 C
October	Note Mini C	Android 16	Qualcomm Dragonwing Q-6690 (2.9GHz Octa-core CPU)	6 GB	64 GB	8.5" (2048x1536) Kaleido 3	new addition to Note series
October	Picco	Proprietary firmware	ESP32-S3 (240MHz Dual-core Xtensa LX7)	8 MB	16 GB (included SD)	3.97"	N/A
Upcoming	Palma 3	Android 16	Qualcomm Dragonwing Q-6690 (2.9GHz Octa-core CPU)	6 GB	128 GB	6.1" (824x1648) HD ePaper glass screen	Palma 2

== GPL compliance ==
As of 2022, Onyx International Inc. has declined to release the source code with Linux kernel modifications licensed under the GNU General Public License version 2 in response to a written request by a user. The GPLv2 license states that if a modified version of a covered work (such as the Linux kernel) is released, the corresponding source code must also be released under GPLv2.

== See also ==
- Comparison of e-book readers
- Comparison of tablet computers
- E-Ink
- E-Paper
