= Alex eReader =

- Manufacturer: Spring Design
- Released: Shipping April 14, 2010
- Introductory price: $399
- Operating system: Android 1.5
- CPU: Monahan PXA303, 624 MHz
- Storage: microSD card
- Display: 6 in (150 mm) E Ink display 3.5 in (89 mm) color touchscreen LCD
- Input: color touchscreen, buttons.
- Connectivity: Wi-Fi
- Power: rechargeable battery
- Dimensions: 225×120×10 mm
- Weight: 310 g (10.9 oz)

The Alex eReader is a discontinued e-book reader created by Spring Design. As with the Barnes & Noble Nook, the Alex features two screens. The upper is a 6-inch monochrome electronic ink screen and the lower is a 3.5 inch HVGA (480×320) touchscreen color LCD. The device has Wi-Fi and mobile network connectivity and Internet browsing. The device runs on Android version 1.5. International release was expected during the first week of March 2010. Device shipment began April 14, 2010. Retail sales were discontinued in 2011. The device allows downloading content from web sites such as Google Books, Epub Books, Gutenberg, Web Books, Feedbooks, Smashwords, and others.

The content is stored on a removable microSD card. Users can also copy content to SD with PC or desktop computers.

== Features ==
The Alex e-reader combines two displays, a larger E Ink display mainly for reading, and a smaller color LCD touchscreen for browsing. Comparing the Alex with the nook e-reader, the smaller LCD screen is used for more than navigation. One can view content on either screen and use a button to change the display back and forth between the E Ink screen and color screen. The color screen is used to annotate text with the text on the EPD screen highlighted in gray whenever there is a highlight, text or voice annotation, or hyperlink to other materials.

The Alex reader includes applications such as a book reader, MP3 player, web browser, tools to manage annotations of e-reader content, an email client and a calculator. It also allows recording voice comments and adding hyperlinks.

== See also ==
- Comparison of e-book readers
- List of Android devices
