= ESlick =

Discontinued e-book reader

- Manufacturer: Foxit
- Dimensions: 188×118×9.2 mm (7.40×4.65×0.36 in) (7.4" * 4.7" * 0.4")
- Weight: 180 g (6.4 oz)
- Operating system: Linux based
- Memory: 512MB internal, SD-card max 4 GB
- Battery: lithium
- Display: 6" E Ink Vizplex screen 600 x 800 pixel resolution, 4-level gray scale

The eSlick is a discontinued e-book reader, an electronic book (e-book) reading device developed by Foxit Software. It has a 6-inch E Ink screen, 600x800 pixel resolution with 4-level gray scale and a mass of 180 g. The device supports text and PDF format for reading and includes Foxit's PDF Creator and Reader Pro Pack software. In August 2010, Foxit announced that it would stop further development of the eSlick and focus on licensing PDF software to the makers of other e-book hardware. Wired attributed the move to a price war between Amazon.com's Kindle and Barnes & Noble's Nook which undermined Foxit's claim to offer the cheapest e-book reader on the market. Foxit dropped its support completely and abruptly in 2010, completely deleting all references to the eSlick from its site, including numerous forum threads and all firmware updates. This action has alienated and angered many users, as the solutions to many problems were readily available in these threads.

The device is notable in that it has minimal features (no wireless, no subscription). It can read books in secure eReader format but does not support any other DRM formats.

== Specifications ==
- Size: 188 x 118 x 9.2 mm (7.4" x 4.7" x 0.4")
- Weight: 180 g (6.4 oz)
- Display:
  - size: 15.5 cm (6 in) diagonal (approx 1/4 area of letter-sized page)
  - resolution: 600 x 800 pixel resolution, 4-level gray scale
- Memory: 512 MB standard (100 eBooks at 1.2 MB each average), SD card expansion up to 4 GB Includes 2GB SD card
- Rechargeable Lithium-ion battery
- PC Interface: USB port
- OS: Embedded Linux

== Formats supported ==
As of Firmware 2.0 Build 1130:

Documents: PDF, TXT, ePUB, eReader format, non-encryped and secure PDB

Images: GIF, BMP, JPEG, and PNG

DRM-free Audio: MP3

== Operating systems ==
=== Windows ===
The eSlick comes bundled with the proprietary Foxit Reader Pro Pack, PDF Creator, PDF Editor (trial) and PDF Page Organizer Pro (trial).

Updating the reader's firmware is done via a proprietary program (eSlick Update Setup Package).

=== Mac OS X and Linux ===
As of firmware 2.0, Linux is supported for flash upgrades. Mac OS X is not supported for flashing the firmware, but the device supports file transfers via USB from any device that can mount a USB drive. The SD card and the internal memory show up as separate mountable drives.

== See also ==
- List of e-book readers
