= Sony Digital Paper =

Line of e-ink readers

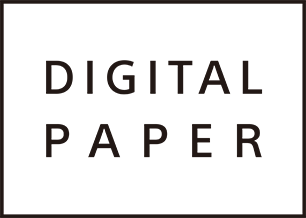

Sony Digital Paper is a line of tablet-size E ink devices by Sony, aimed at business professionals to read and edit digital documents.

== DPT-S1 ==
Sony DPT-S1
- Manufacturer: Sony
- Type: e-reader
- System on a chip: Freescale i.MX508
- CPU: ARM Cortex-A8
- Memory: 1 GB LPDDR2
- Storage: 4 GB
- Removable storage: Up to 32 GB microSDHC
- Display: 338 mm (13.3 in) electrophoretic display, 1200 × 1600 pixels (4:3 aspect ratio) at 150 ppi
- Input: Multi-touch touchscreen display, stylus
- Connectivity: Wi-Fi (802.11 b/g/n 2.4 GHz), Micro USB 2.0
- Power: Non-removable 1270 mAh lithium-ion battery
- Dimensions: 233 mm × 310 mm × 6.8 mm (9.17 in × 12.20 in × 0.27 in)
- Weight: 358 g (12.6 oz)
- Website: www.sony.com/electronics/digital-paper-notepads/dpts1

The Sony DPT-S1 is a 13.3-inch (approaching A4) E ink e-reader by Sony, aimed at professional business users. The DPT-S1 Digital Paper can display only PDF files at their native size and lacks the ability to display any other e-book formats. The reader has been criticized for being too expensive for most consumers, with an initial price of US$1,100, falling to $700 at its end. The reader is lightweight and has low power consumption, a Wi-Fi connection, and a stylus for making notes or highlights.

The DPT-S1 was released in Japan on December 3, 2013 and launched elsewhere in 2014. Sony announced the discontinuation of the DPT-S1 in late 2016.

=== Specifications ===
The 13.3-inch e-Ink Mobius electronic paper screen has a resolution of 1200 × 1600 pixels, with a capacitive touchscreen. The device has an ARM Cortex-A8 at 1 GHz microprocessor. It was built on a SoC circuit made by Freescale. The amount of RAM was not published anywhere. Its internal storage, 4 GB, is shared between system and user; however, it is possible to expand the storage with a microSD card. It weighs 358 g (0.8 pounds) with a thickness of 6.8 mm. Novel to the DPT-S1 was the ability to interface with specific corporate networks by adding encryption, thus allowing legal professionals to make use of it in their workflow by integrating handwritten annotations into PDFs that could propagate when copied.

== DPT-RP1 ==
The Digital Paper DPT-RP1 was announced in April 2017. It features a 13.3-inch screen.

== DPT-CP1 ==
The DPT-CP1 from 2018 had a smaller 10.3-inch screen.

== DPT-RP2 ==
In 2023, Sony introduced the DPT-RP2.

== See also ==
- Comparison of e-book readers
- Comparison of tablet computers
