= IRiver Story =

Type of e-book reader

iRiver Story and Story HD
- Manufacturer: iRiver
- Type: E-book reader
- Released: 2010, 2011
- Operating system: Linux-2.6.28.6
- CPU: Freescale 532 MHz, ARM-11
- Storage: (total/user available) 2 GiB/1.4 GiB internal flash memory
- Display: 6 in diagonal, 3.6 in (91 mm) × 4.8 in (122 mm), Story: 600 × 800 px or 0.48 Mpx, 167 ppi density, 8-level grayscale electronic paper Story HD: 768 × 1024 px or 0.79 Mpx, 213 ppi density, 16-level grayscale electronic paper
- Input: USB 2.0 port (mini-B connector), SD card 3.5 mm stereo headphone jack built-in speaker, AC power adapter jack
- Dimensions: 203 × 127 × 9 mm
- Weight: 284 grams, 208 g (HD)

The iRiver Story is an e-book reader manufactured and marketed by iRiver and employing a Linux operating system. The iRiver Story HD is a related product with higher display resolution and a display manufactured by LG.

The device uses code licensed under the GPL, but iRiver did not make the sources available immediately; this issue has since been addressed. The reader was updated in July 2010, and supports Wi-Fi. A July 2011 update integrated the device with the Google eBooks store. The product was a Target exclusive release.

The product line was discontinued in 2012.

== Reception ==
Independent reviews of the July 2011 release of the iRiver Story were mixed. Although stating that "It's a good product", a reviewer for PC Magazine concluded that "both the hardware and software fall short of the Kindle and the Nook". Laptop Magazine's reviewer wrote that the device "sports a high-definition display but falls short on ergonomics". Engadget's reviewer commented that the device "looks downright ancient" and has "relatively limited functionality". Cnet's reviewer observed that its high-resolution display "does provide for added detail in images and slightly sharper text" but concluded that "it's tough to recommend over its identically priced competitors, which offer touch screens and 3G". PC World's reviewer found herself "frustrated by the Story HD's cheap design, poky performance, and Google Books interface".

== See also ==
- Comparison of e-book readers
- Comparison of tablet computers
