= BeBook =

BeBook is a trademark of Endless Ideas, a Dutch manufacturer of e-book readers and tablet computers. The first BeBook device was a rebranding of the Hanlin eReader.

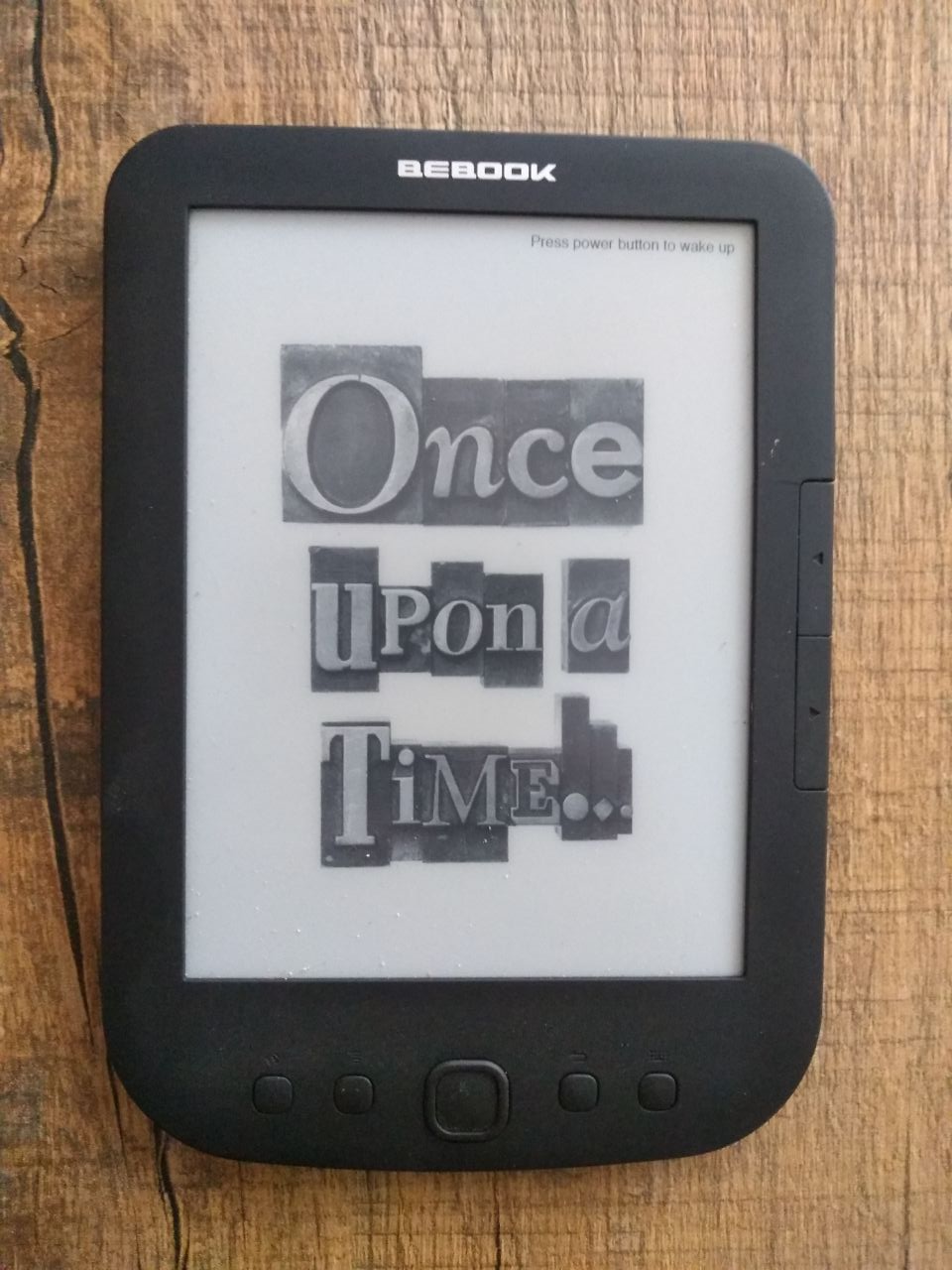
The Bebook Neo with a locked screen

The company offered the following devices:

- BeBook Club
- BeBook Club S
- BeBook Live
- BeBook Mini
- Bebook Neo
- BeBook One
- BeBook Pure
- BeBook Touch

In January 2012, Endless Ideas filed for bankruptcy.
