= Pocket eDGe =

enTourage pocket eDGe
- Manufacturer: enTourage Systems, Inc.
- Type: Hybrid tablet computer, e-book
- Released: November 12, 2010
- Operating system: Android 2.2
- CPU: 800 MHz Marvell PXA168
- Storage: (total/user available) 3,7 GB/3 GB internal flash memory Formats supported: File: EPUB, PDF; Audio: MP3, WAV, 3GPP, MP4, AAC, OGG, M4A; Video: 3GP, MP4, Adobe Flash Lite (H.264)
- Display: E-paper: mono e-ink display 6.0 in diagonal 800 x 600 pixels 8-level grayscale LCD: colour TFT display 7 in diagonal 800 × 480 pixels 16,777,216 colour tones
- Input: 2 x USB 2.0, micro-SD card MMC; SDHC built-in microphone 3.5 mm stereo headphone jack built-in speaker, AC power adapter jack
- Camera: Front camera: 2 megapixel
- Connectivity: WiFi 802.11 b/g Bluetooth 2.1 + EDR
- Power: lithium polymer battery 6hr life on LCD; 16hr life on E-Reader
- Dimensions: 7.5 × 5.5 × 1.0 in when closed
- Weight: 1.35 lb (610 g)

The enTourage pocket eDGe is a discontinued combined tablet computer and e-book made by enTourage Systems Inc., a small company based out of McLean, Virginia. It is the first follow on to the original EnTourage eDGe released earlier in 2010. The device runs Google's Android platform, version 2.2. It is called by the manufacturer as the world's first mini-dualbook".

On May 23, 2011 the company announced that it would no longer manufacture and distribute the Pocket Edge.

== Features ==
The Pocket eDGe is a dual-screen device. One screen is a touch-sensitive 6.0 inch E Ink display, while the other screen is a full-color 7.0 inch LCD touch screen. The color display side runs Android. Unlike most android devices, entourage pocket edge has its own suite of applications, rather than using the Android Market. Both displays are touchscreens, and the interface of the device provides interaction between the two according to appropriate actions and data formats. The LCD is designed for multimedia display, whereas the e-Ink screen is designed for reading and, in the corresponding mode, the ink can be marked as handwriting, indexed, searched, and even converted to text.
