= TrekStor =

German manufacturing company

TrekStor GmbH & Co. KG
- Industry: Electronics
- Founded: 2001; 25 years ago
- Headquarters: Bensheim, Germany

TrekStor GmbH & Co. KG is a defunct German manufacturer of portable storage products, audio devices and tablet computers incorporated in 2001 and located in Bensheim, Hesse, Germany.

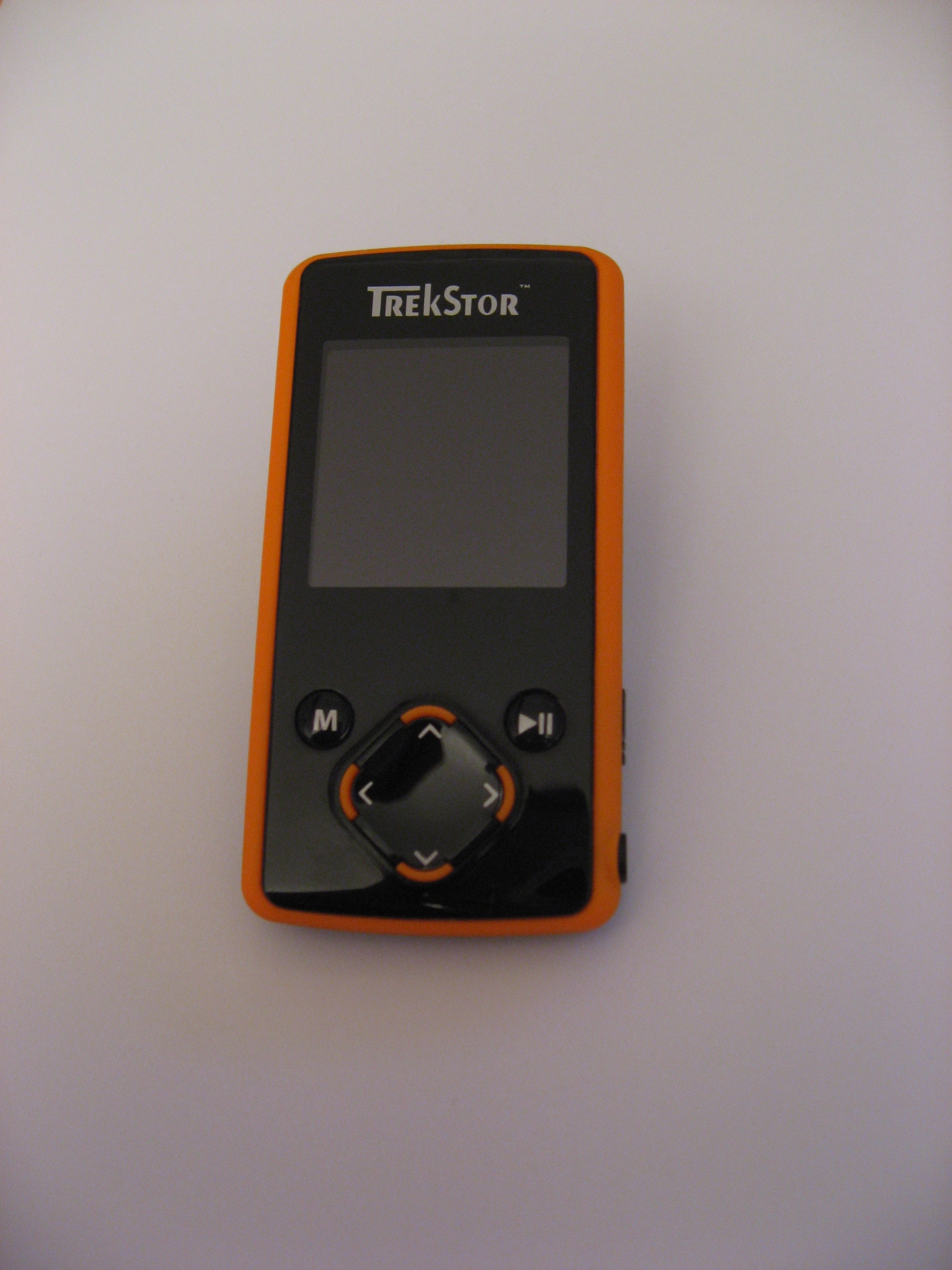
TrekStor MP3 Player i.Beat move S 4Gb

The company is primarily known for its MP3 players, hard disk drives, tablet computers and USB flash drives. TrekStor is a brand of digital media players in Germany.

Major sub-brands are DataStation, MovieStation, vibez and i.Beat.

In August 2007, they became a subject of a brief controversy due to the name of the latest of their i.Beat MP3 player series, the i.Beat blaxx, which is pronounced as "I beat blacks." After this was pointed out, they soon renamed the player the TrekStor Blaxx.

In July 2009 the company announced its insolvency. However, an investor (TrekStor GmbH now part of Hong-Kong–based Telefield International Holdings Limited) was found and the company could continue its business. In 2010 an eBook reader was released. TrekStor also develops its own series of tablet computers.

== History ==
Trekstor GmbH & Co. KG was established in 2001 by Daniel Szmigiel in Lorsch, a town situated between Mannheim and Frankfurt am Main in the German state of Hesse. Initially focusing on USB sticks including biometric security with built-in fingerprint readers, the company expanded its product line in 2003 to include MP3 players and external hard drives. By 2016, Trekstor had moved its headquarters to the nearby town of Bensheim.

In Bensheim, the company centralised its sales, parts of production, development, and quality management operations, although the bulk of its manufacturing was conducted in Asia. Following its inception, Trekstor grew its workforce and achieved a total revenue of 145 million euros in 2005. Two years later, in 2007, the company posted significant turnover, amounting to more than 135 million euros.

After experiencing two years of declining success, Trekstor GmbH & Co. KG filed for insolvency on July 21, 2009. Subsequently, with financial backing in the form of a loan against assets and an investment from Telefield International (Holding) Limited, a new entity, Trekstor GmbH, was established in early November 2009. This new company assumed the employees, inventory, and intellectual property rights from the former entity.

By the end of 2010, Trekstor had expanded its product offerings, introducing an e-book reader and several mobile phone sector products. Notably, the company launched a portable UMTS WLAN hotspot and two Android-based smartphones, developed in partnership with the Chinese company Huawei.

From 2012 onwards, Trekstor continued to innovate in the digital reading space with the Trekstor Liro Ink, an e-book reader featuring electronic ink, marketed through the German Publishers and Booksellers Association. Additionally, tablet computers were included in the company’s range of products during this period.

In autumn 2013, Trekstor introduced the first Volks tablet, which was produced in collaboration with Bild.de. By mid-November 2014, Trekstor had released the third generation of this tablet series. The initial models—the Trekstor Volks-Tablet (2013) and the Trekstor SurfTab xiron 10.1 3G (2014)—operated on the Android system. With the SurfTab wintron 10.1 and its 3G variant for mobile internet, Trekstor launched a Volks tablet for the first time using the Windows 8.1 with Bing operating system, which could also be used with an attachable keyboard.

According to its 2016 financial report, Trekstor became the manufacturer of the Porsche Design Book One in 2017. By 2019, the company returned to full ownership by the Szmigiel family and expanded into manufacturing street-legal e-scooters.

On May 30, 2022, TrekStor GmbH was renamed TS-Service GmbH. However, on October 1, 2022, TS-Service GmbH filed for insolvency.

== Controversy ==
In August 2007, a black MP3 player from the i.Beat series was announced in a press release as the "i.Beat blaxx," which phonetically sounded like "I beat blacks." Following criticism, including a negative post on Gizmodo, the player was renamed the "Trekstor blaxx" the next day.
