= Kolporter Holding =

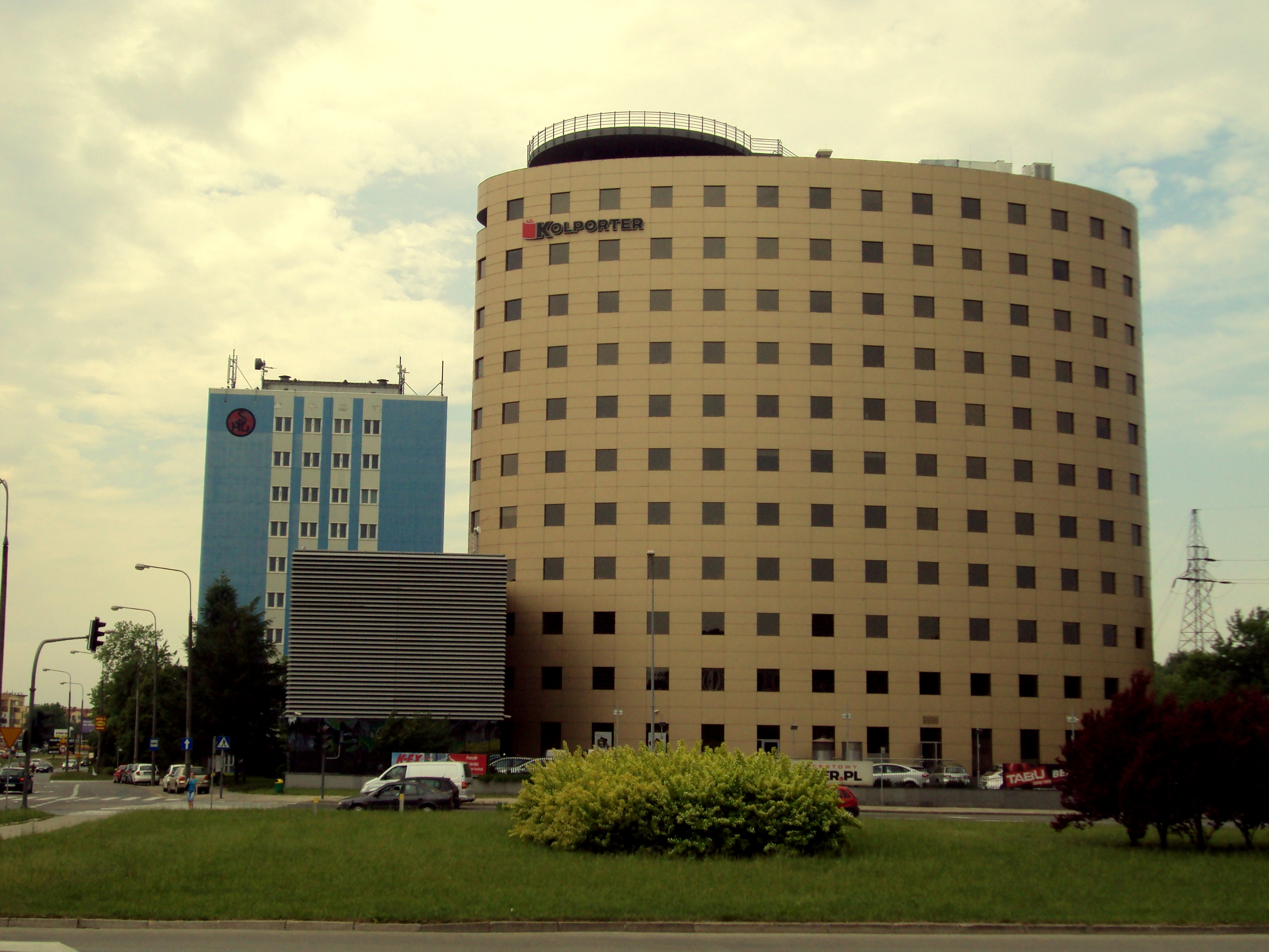
Kolporter headquarters

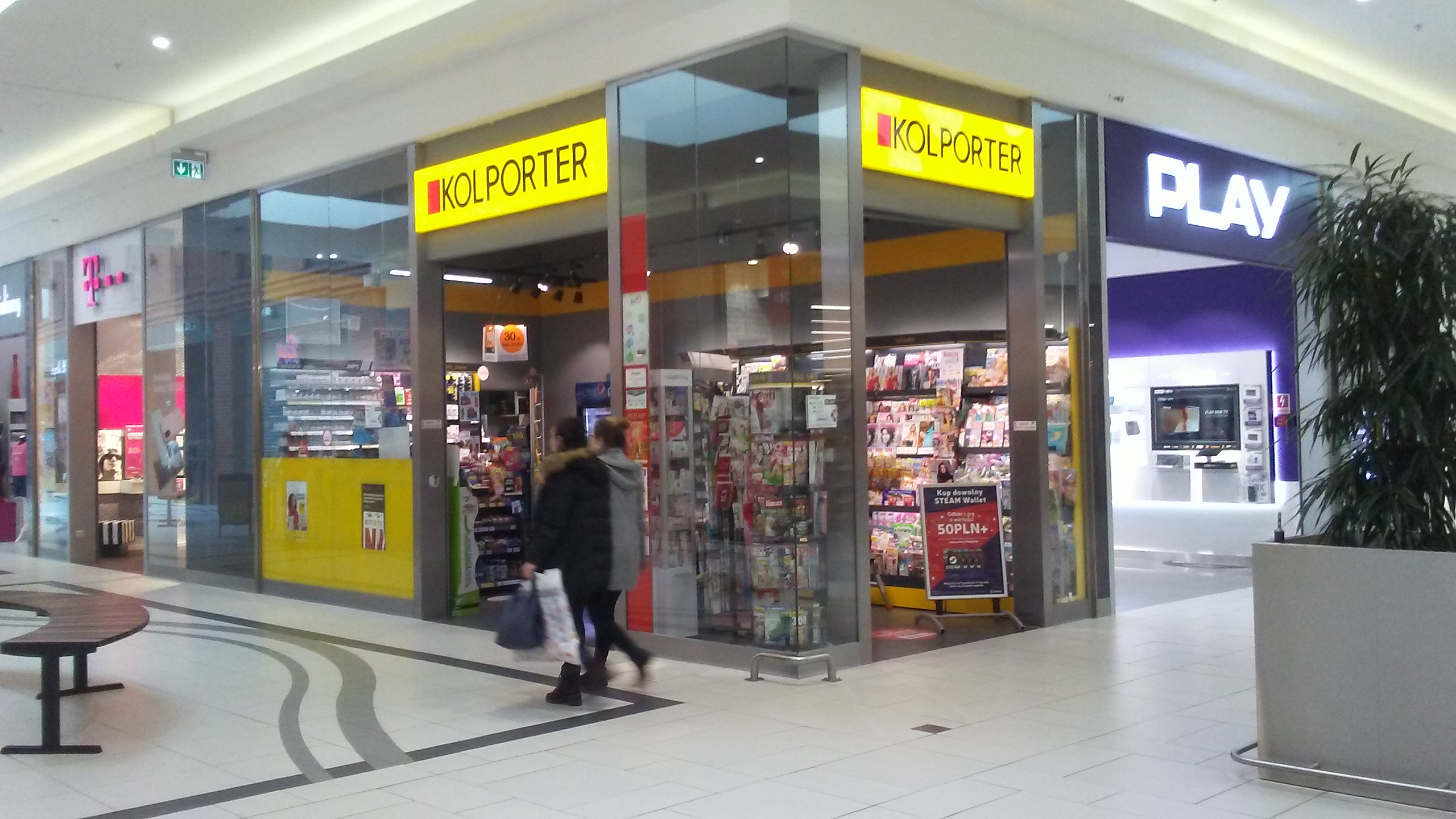
A Kolporter convenience store at Galeria Tomaszów in Tomaszów Mazowiecki

Kolporter sp. z o.o. is a Polish company, specialising in fast-moving consumer goods. It was established in 1990 by Krzysztof Klicki, initially to distribute copies of Gazeta Wyborcza to PSS "Społem" stores, and has its headquarters in Kielce. It has made the Top 500 Polish Companies rankings in Polityka and Rzeczpospolita several times.

Its name comes from its initial business, the distribution (colportage) of newspapers and magazines. The name Kolporter means "distributor" in Polish. Now there are over a dozen companies in many sectors of the Polish market that are part of the Kolporter. Since 1997, Kolporter also runs a chain of newsagent kiosks and convenience stores throughout the country.

== Sponsorship ==
Kolporter was a sponsor of Korona Kielce football team.
