= Kovio (disambiguation) =

Kovio is a privately held Silicon Valley technology company.

Kovio may refer to:

- Mekeo language
- Kunimaipa language
