= Opticom =

Opticom may refer to:

- Opticom (company), a Norwegian electronics company
- Opticom System, a signal preemption device
