= Migo (company) =

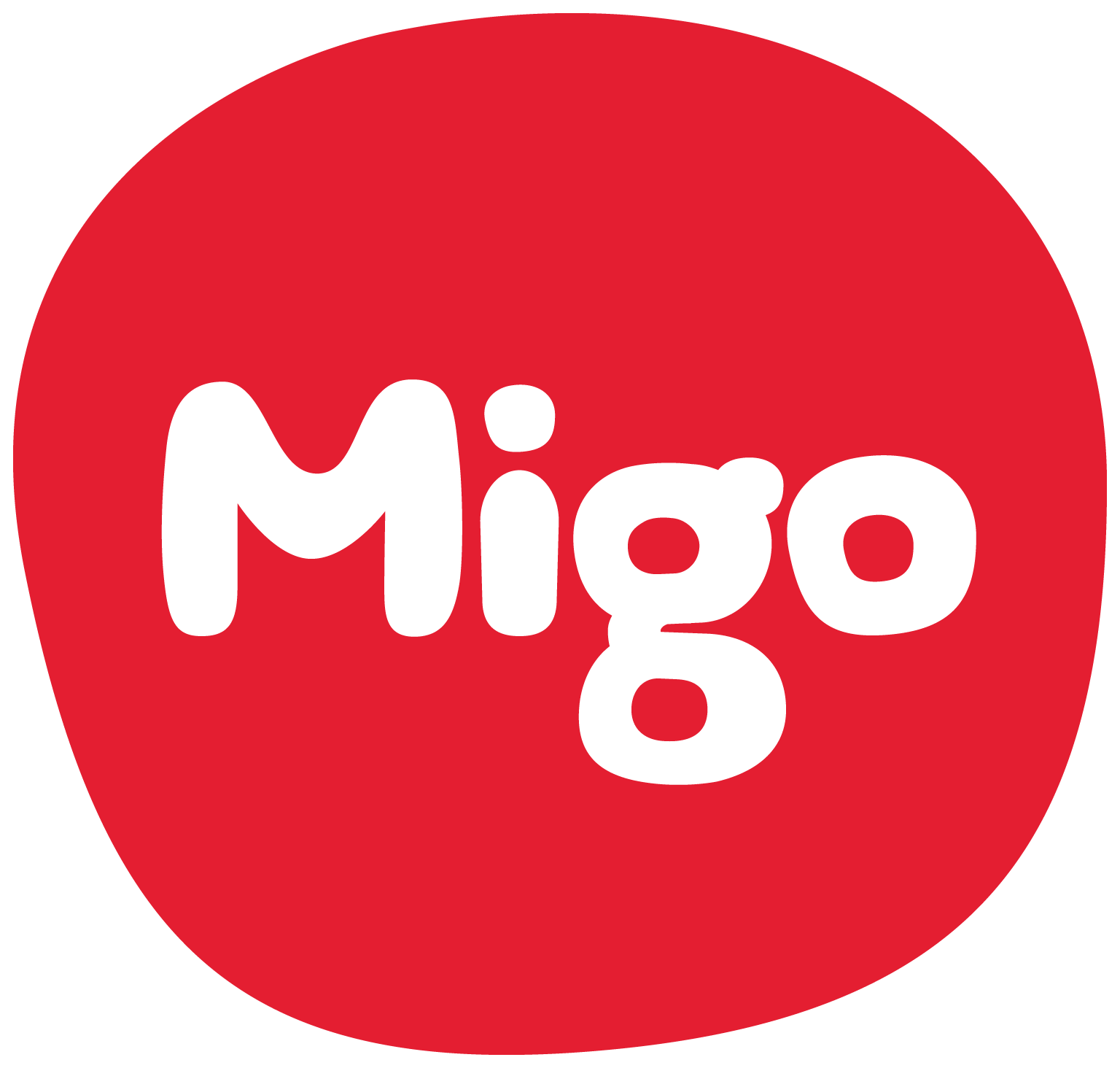
- Type: Private
- Industry: Technology, Media, Telecommunications; Retail; Digital Consumer Goods
- Founder: Barrett Comiskey
- Headquarters: Taipei, Taiwan & Jakarta, Indonesia
- Area served: Indonesia
- Services: Offline Content Delivery
- Number of employees: 200+

Migo (Traditional Chinese: 熱鬧點) is a technology company that "provides affordable data services for emerging markets". Its content delivery network distributes digital products and services to mass market consumers at the local corner store through Migo Download Stations (MDS).

As of May 2022, Migo had 1,400 MDS in Indonesia covering an estimated population of 25 million Indonesians. Migo aims to grow 10 times and cover up to 100 million people in Java, the world's most populous island, and launch in the Philippines by end of 2022.

Migo was founded by Barrett Comiskey who was inducted into the National Inventors Hall of Fame in 2016 for inventing electronic ink and co-founding the E Ink Corporation. Electronic ink is the technology used in the display of e-readers such as the Amazon Kindle.

Migo launched in Indonesia in June 2020. It has existing partnerships for Entertainment content, Education content and Distribution:

- For Entertainment content: GoPlay (the streaming service owned by Indonesian decacorn Gojek), Genflix (one of the first OTTs to launch in Indonesia), Vision+ (MNC's premium OTT), MD Pictures, Starvision, Sushiroll, SBS, JTBC, KBS Media, CJ ENM, Lionsgate
- For Education content: EdTech providers such as Zenius and Sekolahmu and government bodies like the Ministry of Education and Research and Technology (Kemendikbud)
- For Distribution: Sampoerna Retail Community

In September 2021, Indonesian media conglomerate MNC Group, through its subsidiary MNC Vision Networks, invested $40M in Migo Indonesia to accelerate Migo Indonesia's rollout.

Until February 2023, Migo ran its R&D, Engineering and Supply Chain center in Taipei, with its Indonesian commercial operations based in Jakarta. Migo also has a support center in Manila.

== Investors ==
Migo is backed by sovereign wealth fund Temasek, YouTube's co-founder and former CTO Steve Chen, Founder of Farallon Capital Management's Asian business Raymond Zage, Indonesia Stock Exchange commissioner Pandu Sjahrir, Provident Capital, members from the family of Hysan Development in Hong Kong, Vickers Venture Partners, and Singaporean businessman Koh Boon Hwee.
