= Ensurge Micropower ASA =

Norwegian microbattery manufacturing company

- Type: Allmennaksjeselskap
- Traded as: OSE: ENSU; OTCQB: ENMPD
- Industry: Electronic components
- Predecessor: Thin Film Electronics ASA
- Founded: 2005
- Headquarters: San Jose, California, USA
- Key people: Lars Eikeland (CEO); Terje Rogne (Chair)
- Products: Solid-state lithium batteries
- Website: ensurge.com

Ensurge Micropower ASA (Oslo Stock Exchange : ENSU; OTCQB : ENMPD) is a Norwegian microbattery manufacturing company with global headquarters, R&D offices, and flexible electronics manufacturing in San Jose, California, United States and corporate headquarters in Oslo. Ensurge designs, develops, and produces solid-state lithium battery (SSLB) products using roll-to-roll printing technology on stainless steel substrates.

Ensurge announced an updated corporate strategy based on SSLB products in January 2020, when it was known as Thin Film Electronics ASA. Previously, the company used flexible and printed electronics manufacturing to produce NFC tags, Electronic article surveillance labels, and temperature sensing smart labels.

== History ==
The company developed printable memories based on polymer materials as early as 1994; first as part of Opticom ASA and then as an independent company named Thin Film Electronics ASA.

It focused at first on hybrid memory devices with polymer-based memory and silicon-based control circuitry, as developed jointly with Intel. Beginning in 2006, the company concentrated its efforts on printed electronics. It successfully demonstrated roll-to-roll printed organic memory in 2009 and was awarded the IDTechEx Technical Development Manufacturing Award the same year. Its printed memory technology was licensed to Xerox in December 2014 and marketed as of June 2016 as Xerox Printed Memory.

In January 2014, the company acquired the flexible electronics technology, including steel substrate, barrier materials, and encapsulation IP, of Kovio and opened a major R&D office in San Jose, California.

In February 2015, the company demonstrated a connected NFC "smart bottle" at the Mobile World Congress in Barcelona. This announcement coincided with the launch of NFC OpenSense technology, a patented printed NFC 'electronic seal' tag feature that allowed a smartphone to determine whether a bottle was factory sealed or previously opened.

In January 2020, the company announced an updated strategy focused on the design, development, and production of solid-state lithium battery (SSLB) products. The SSLB products are to be manufactured in its San Jose, California manufacturing facility.

In June 2021, the company rebranded as Ensurge Micropower ASA.

== Technology ==
Ensurge solid-state lithium battery (SSLB) technology is used to manufacture rechargeable microbattery products. The company states that the products use a solid electrolyte material that is fundamentally safer than liquid and gel polymer electrolytes used in common rechargeable batteries. Ensurge's use of stainless steel substrates, rather than silicon or ceramic substrates, gives the company a unique ability to substantially scale production capacity using high-volume roll-based manufacturing methods. The resulting battery products are designed to extend battery life (through higher volumetric energy densities), increase device lifetime (through higher charge/discharge cycling counts), and improve design flexibility (by enabling unconventional battery sizes). The company believes that the resulting battery products will be particularly useful in market segments including wearable electronics and connected sensors.

== Awards ==
The company has won a number of awards for innovation and technical development since first demonstrating roll-to-roll printing of electronics in 2009.

In 2012, it was awarded both the IDTechEx Product Development Award and the FlexTech Alliance Innovation Award for its Addressable Memory technology built in association with PARC. Also in late 2012, it was named as a runner-up in the Wall Street Journal Technology's Innovation Award.

In October 2012, it won the 2012 World Technology Award for Visionary Contribution to Materials Science and Technology in the development of printed smart tags for the Internet of Things.

In November 2018, the company's stainless-steel substrate roll-to-roll factory in San Jose, California won the IDTechEx Technical Development Manufacturing Award.
