= Migo =

Migo may refer to:

== People ==
- Hisao Migo (1900–1985), Japanese botanist
- Migo Adecer (born 1999), Filipino-Australian singer

== Other uses ==
- Mi-Go, a fictional race of extraterrestrials created by H. P. Lovecraft
- Migo (company), a Taiwanese company
- Migo, a main character in the movie Smallfoot
- Migo (also Migu or Miggo), a Talmudic principle
- Migo Island, Torbay, Western Australia
- Migos, American hip hop trio
