= Opticom (company) =

Norwegian research and development company

Opticom ASA
- Industry: Electronic Components Development
- Founded: 1994; 32 years ago
- Headquarters: Norway
- Subsidiaries: Thin Film Electronics ASA

Opticom ASA is a Norwegian research and development company. The Opticom share was listed on the Oslo Børs (Oslo Stock Exchange) in 1997 and on the main list from the start of trading in January, 2000. Since its establishment in 1994, Opticom and its subsidiaries have done research and development within a number of areas, especially the emerging field of polymer electronics.

The company developed polymer-based memory chips through its majority-owned subsidiary Thin Film Electronics ASA (TFE). Opticom and Intel, which owned a minority stake in TFE, wound down their joint development work in 2005 because of technical and changes in strategic direction. Opticom has announced its intention to pursue other avenues for the technology underlying TFE's memory designs. Opticom also owned nearly a tenth of Fast Search and Transfer.

Opticom can be seen as an example of the year 2000 internet bubble, reaching a market capitalization of nearly $8 billion at its highest, still without revenues.
