= Raymond Zage =

Singapore-based businessman from Schaumburg, Illinois

George Raymond Zage, III (born January 20, 1970) is a Singapore-based businessman and former hedge fund manager from Schaumburg, Illinois, USA.

== Career ==
After 8 years at Goldman Sachs, Zage rose to prominence at Farallon Capital Management, where he founded the hedge fund's Asian business.

At Farallon, Zage spearheaded large private investments in Asian corporates in a way that differed from Farallon's historical investment approach. These investments included the purchase of a controlling stake in Bank Central Asia after the Asian Financial Crisis, an investment in Aston Resources, which eventually listed and merged with Whitehaven Coal and Go-Jek, where he is on the board.

These investments required Farallon to establish new, closed-end investment vehicles, including Farallon Asian Special Situations I, II and III, a marked departure from the liquid hedge fund that Farallon had traditionally managed.

After leaving Farallon to found Tiga Investments, Zage was involved in a restructuring of Lippo Karawaci, where he joined the board.

In 2020, Zage was a lead investor in the over $600 million acquisition of Grindr from Chinese gambling company Beijing Kunlun Tech Co. This transaction was a result of the decision by the US government's Committee on Foreign Investment in the United States (CFIUS) to compel the owner of Grindr, a Shenzhen-listed Chinese company, to sell the company to US interests.

Zage is an independent director of Toshiba, and has also made personal investments in Whistler, BC.

== Personal life ==
Zage has been a co-opted member of the Investment Committee of the National University of Singapore and is the chair of the board of the foundation of the Singapore American School. He has also been active in Room to Read, and is active in numerous other philanthropic activities.
