= Joseph Jacobson =

American physicist (born 1965)

Joseph Jacobson (born June 28, 1965 in Newton, Massachusetts), is a tenured professor and head of the Molecular Machines group at the Center for Bits and Atoms at the MIT Media Lab, and is one of the inventors of microencapsulated electrophoretic display (known as E Ink) commonly used in electronic devices such as e-readers. He is the founder of several companies including E Ink Corporation, Gen9, Inc., and Kovio, and serves on the scientific board of several more companies (such as Epitome Biosystems).

== Education and career ==
Jacobson received an Sc.B. in physics at Brown University and a Ph.D. in physics at the Massachusetts Institute of Technology. He was a postdoctoral research associate at Stanford University in experimental and theoretical nonlinear non-local quantum systems. While at Stanford, he set the world record for the shortest pulse ever generated by a laser (in optical cycles).

Jacobson first had the idea for the e-book in 1993, while working on his postdoctoral research in quantum mechanics.

In 1997, Jacobson along with JD Albert, Barrett Comiskey, Russ Wilcox and Jerome Rubin founded E Ink Corporation.

In 1999, MIT's Technology Review named Jacobson as one of the TR100, one of the most influential inventors under the age of 35. He invented nanoparticle–based ink that can print on a flexible computer processor using an inkjet printer. He was awarded the Gutenberg Prize of the International Gutenberg Society and the City of Mainz in 2000. In 2001, he received a Discovery magazine award for technological innovation. In 2002, he received a National Inventors Hall of Fame Collegiate Inventors Award. In 2013 Jacobson received the Wilhelm Exner Medal. On 5 May 2016, Jacobson was inducted into the National Inventors Hall of Fame for his work in developing E Ink.
