= Cybook Opus =

- Manufacturer: Bookeen
- Type: E-book reader
- Released: July 27, 2009
- Media: Mobipocket PRC, PalmDoc, HTML, TXT, PDF, EPub
- Operating system: Linux
- CPU: Samsung S3C2440 ARM920T 400MHz
- Memory: 32MB RAM
- Storage: 1GB Data Flash
- Display: 5" E Ink Vizplex screen 600x800 pixels, 200 dpi, black and white, 2-bit gray-scale
- Connectivity: USB
- Power: Li-Polymer battery (1000mAh)
- Dimensions: 151 mm x 108mm x 10mm ( 6" x 4.2" x 0.4")
- Weight: Less than 150g (< 5.3 oz )
- Related: Cybook Gen3, Cybook Orizon

Cybook Opus is a 5-inch e-reader, specially designed for reading e-books and e-news. It is produced by the French company Bookeen.

== Description ==
The Cybook Opus is an ultra-light reading device based on E Ink screen technology. The device is 4.2″ x 6″ x 0.4″ inches and weighs 5.3 oz (150 g), battery included. It features E Ink electronic ink with a 200 dpi display which is enough for text, although not enough for high quality images. Its screen possesses a paper-like high contrast appearance and is readable under direct sunlight. It is not the best E-Ink screen available, as it supports only 4 shades of gray compared with the 8 or 16 shades on some other readers.

=== Controls ===
The control system include: -two long buttons to the right of the screen (in standard portrait mode) to handle page navigation. Side buttons can be flipped (“Advanced…” menu), allowing one hand page turns with thumb on lower button (portrait modes only). -a four-way navigation wheel with a button at its centre below the screen, which is primarily used for navigating the menu system but can also be used for page navigation. The menu is activated by a dedicated button, and then there's a back button to return to the previous option or screen. It has an accelerometer that allows it to switch from portrait to landscape mode automatically (if the option is enabled), which will appeal equally to left and right-handed readers. All the controls change to match the orientation, and behave as a user would expect - whichever page button is "top" or "right" will go to the next page, and the "bottom" or "left" button will go to the previous page, no matter which way around you hold the Opus. While reading and also in the “Library”, keeping next/previous page button pressed will enter the fast pagination mode.

=== Battery and power ===
It has a Lithium Polymer (Li-Polymer) rechargeable (and replaceable, unlike other devices) battery, with a battery lifetime of 8,000 page flips. The page flips are the only thing that consumes battery. To charge the device, you use the same included USB cable that you use for transferring content to it (either via free Adobe Digital Editions software or by dragging and dropping to storage). It takes 5 hours for a full charge.

=== Storage, copying and organizing the library ===
To a host computer the Cybook functions as a typical USB mass storage device. The user can categorize your books into folders and subfolders for easy access. It stores up to 1,000 titles in 1 GB of built in flash memory. A Micro Secure Digital card slot allows for expanded storage, which does support SDHC cards for up to 32 GB more storage space.

=== Formats supported ===
The device uses TrueType fonts (TTF), and can also be used as an image viewer. Text formats : Adobe ePub / PDF (native or DRM-protected), TXT, FictionBook (.fb2) and HTML files without any conversions. One has to choose between ePub or Mobi (due to Amazon contract restrictions), but you can swap Mobi and ePUB firmware as often as you wish (and as sensible). Conversions from all formats can be done with 3rd party software such as Calibre. Image formats (black and white): JPEG, GIF and PNG The Cybook technically supports PDF files, however it doesn't actually reflow text. Current firmware revisions support ten levels of zoom and allow scrolling around the page, making the device suitable for reading many PDF files.

=== Fonts and text display ===
12 font sizes, from very small to very large (works with ePub, HTML, FB2, TXT). You can add your own fonts. Create a folder called "Fonts" (the name is case sensitive) under the "CyBook" USB drive and add your TrueType or OpenType fonts to it (works with ePub, HTML, FB2, TXT). Layout can be switched between justified and left-aligned text (works with ePub, HTML, FB2, TXT). Text emboldening: allows setting text in bold for maximized contrast (works with ePub, HTML, FB2, TXT).

=== Operating system and firmware ===
The Cybook Opus runs Linux as its underlying operating system; however, the firmware is open source but not the application. This could be due to the support for DRM protected e-books, which probably require third party libraries. June 2010 Bookeen published a much improved firmware. This new firmware, (V2.1 build 1198) brings the 1 second mode: Cybook can be switched on/off in 1 second, keeping last read page open -this allows you to switch on and off without having to boot each time. See the .pdf readme file User interface is available in a total of 23 languages.

== See also ==
- List of e-book readers - other similar devices
