= Pubsoft =

American cloud-based eBook publishing platform

- Developer: Isaac Shi
- Release: 2012
- Type: Cloud-based eBook publishing platform

Pubsoft was a cloud-based eBook publishing platform headquartered in Houston, Texas. It served as the publishing engine for its parent company Kbuuk, LLC, a self-publishing software company that provided digital conversion, distribution and marketing services for authors. Pubsoft was designed to allow publishers to create and manage an online eBook store for direct consumer sales. Publishers could also use Pubsoft to handle social media marketing, deliver eBooks to mobile devices, manage author and reader relationships and distribute royalties through an administrative portal that uses PayPal.

The Pubsoft system also provided book-level analytics designed to help publishers and authors move toward data-driven publishing. Originally designed for the trade publishing sector, the Pubsoft system was later used for a variety of applications by agencies, education and creative writing programs, enterprises, industry experts and religious organizations.

Pubsoft allowed companies to manage content by uploading documents and converting them to EPUB 3.0 eBooks, which could then be read in a web browser or on an iOS device. Through the Pubsoft back-end system, an administrator or instructor could then evaluate reading progress and engagement, as well as assess reading comprehension through customized quizzes.

== History ==
Pubsoft was founded and launched in 2012 by CEO Isaac Shi and COO Dougal Cameron. The company went out of business in May 2019.

== Technology ==
Pubsoft was a multi-tenant software-as-a-service (SaaS) eBook publishing platform that was designed to support digital publishing industry standard EPUB 3.0, an XML-based eBook content standard. Pubsoft utilized a Model View Controller (MVC) design pattern, and the system contains three layers: a database layer created in MySQL, a business logic layer built on a Zend framework and a responsive user interface layer created with HTML5 and CSS3.

As an enterprise-grade application, the Pubsoft database was built on a relationship schema compatible with Boyce-Codd Normal Form (BCNF), which was designed to ensure scalability, reliability and data integrity.

The Pubsoft SaaS application was deployed on Amazon Elastic Compute Cloud and Amazon Relational Database Service.
