= Cybook Orizon =

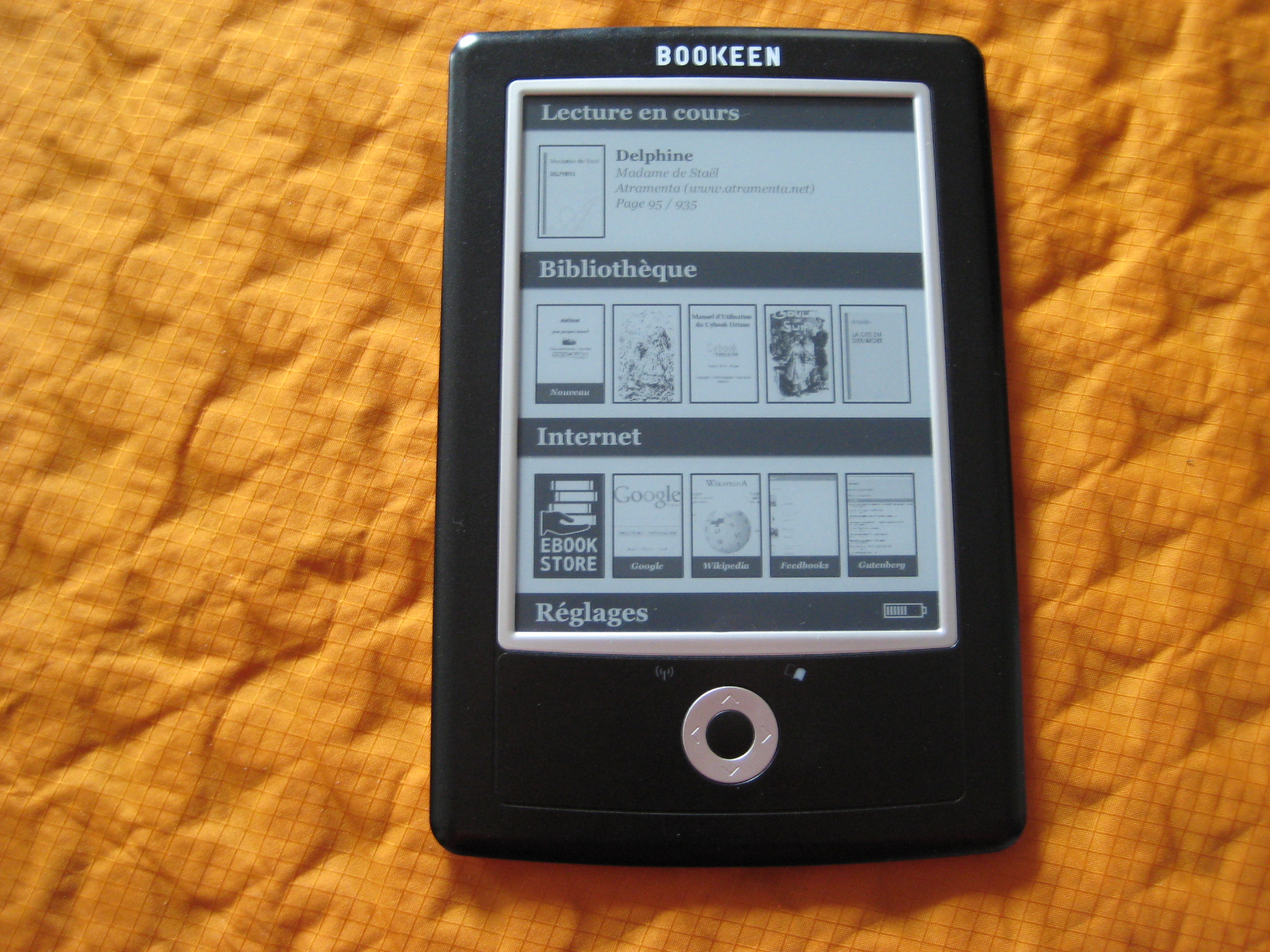
- Manufacturer: Bookeen
- Type: E-book reader
- Released: October 15, 2010
- Media: EPub, PDF (with or without DRM), HTML, TXT; photo formats (16 level greyscale) : JPEG, GIF and PNG
- Operating system: Linux
- CPU: Samsung S3C2416 (ARM926EJ-S core), 400MHz
- Memory: 64MB RAM
- Storage: 2GB Data Flash + 1 microSDHC memory card slot (max 8GB)
- Display: 6" E Ink SiPix; 600x800 pixels, 167 dpi, black and white, 16 levels gray-scale
- Input: Multi-touch Screen, central button and 4 arrow keys
- Connectivity: USB, Wi-Fi (802.11 b/g/n), Bluetooth
- Power: Li-Polymer battery (1050 mAh)
- Online services: Bookeen Bookstore
- Dimensions: 189.49 mm x 125.7 mm x 7.6 mm (7.5" x 4.9" x 0.29")
- Weight: 245 g - 8.6 oz
- Predecessor: Cybook Gen3
- Successor: Cybook Odyssey
- Related: Cybook Opus

Cybook Orizon is a 6-inch e-Reader, specially designed for reading e-Books. It is produced by the French company Bookeen.

== See also ==
- Comparison of e-book readers
- Comparison of tablet computers
