= Cybook Gen3 =

- Cybook Gen3 boot screen
- Manufacturer: Bookeen
- Type: E-book reader
- Released: October 29, 2007
- Media: Mobipocket PRC or ePub (selectable via different firmware), PalmDoc, HTML, TXT, PDF
- Operating system: Linux
- CPU: Revision 1 & 2:Samsung S3C2410 ARM920T 200MHz; Revision 3 & GoldEdition:Samsung S3C2440 ARM920T 400Mhz
- Memory: Version 1 & 2: 16 MB RAM; Version 3 & Gold Edition: 32 MB RAM
- Storage: Revision 1: 64 MB Data Flash; Revision 2, 3: 512 MB Data Flash; Gold Edition: 1GB Data Flash
- Display: 6" E Ink Vizplex screen 600x800 pixels, 166 dpi, black and white, 2 bit gray-scale on Rev1,2 and 3, 8 gray-scale level on Gold Edition
- Connectivity: USB
- Power: Li-Polymer battery (1000mAh)
- Dimensions: 118 x 188 x 8.5 mm (4.7" x 7.4" x 0.3")
- Weight: 174 g (6.13 ounces)
- Predecessor: Cybook Gen1
- Successor: Cybook Orizon
- Related: Cybook Opus

Cybook Gen3 is a 6-inch (15.2 cm) e-reader for reading e-books and periodicals, and it can be used to listen to MP3 and audiobook files. It was produced by the French company Bookeen.

== Description ==
The Cybook Gen3 is a reading device based on E Ink screen technology. Its screen possesses a paper-like high contrast appearance and is readable under direct sunlight. The device offers a battery lifetime of 8,000 page flips. The Cybook Gen3 reads many file formats and offers access to a wide range of digital documents. A Secure Digital card slot allows for expanded storage. To a host computer the Cybook Gen3 functions as a typical USB mass storage device, which allows for copying books from a computer. For this reason it is supported on all major operating systems, including Linux.

The device uses TrueType fonts (.ttf), and can also be used as an image viewer to display JPEG, GIF and PNG files, as well as to play MP3 files. The Cybook Gen3 supports PDF files, however it doesn't reflow text and early firmware did not allow zooming in on documents. Current firmware revisions support ten levels of zoom and allow scrolling around the page, making the device suitable for reading many PDF files. However, very large PDF files take a long time to display once the file is selected. Some PDF files also cause the firmware to crash, which requires a hard reset by pressing the small button on the back side.

The Cybook Gen3 runs Linux as its underlying operating system. While the firmware source code is mostly open-source, the Mobipocket reader application which allows the display of DRM-protected content is closed-source.

== See also ==
- Comparison of e-book readers
- Comparison of tablet computers
- Cybook Opus - A newer product from Bookeen
