= JD Albert =

American engineer, inventor, and educator

JD Albert (born April 18, 1975) is an American engineer, inventor, and educator. Albert is one of the inventors of microencapsulated electrophoretic display (known as E Ink) commonly used in electronic devices such as e-readers.

In 2016 Albert became one of the youngest inventors ever inducted into the National Inventors Hall of Fame. Albert is named on over 100 US patents. He teaches product development in the University of Pennsylvania's Integrated Product Design (IPD) program.

== Career ==
Along with Barrett Comiskey, he developed the E Ink display. The two invented E Ink while they were undergraduates at MIT. MIT Media Lab professor Joseph Jacobson recruited them to create a technology that mimicked pages in a book. As Albert told Science Friday, "It was ... experimental discovery. ... We had ideas, we were doing a lot of research, reading a lot of patents — many of which were expired patents — recreating experiments, and really, truly forging ahead to make this thing work. It involved a lot of prototypes, and it involved a huge amount of failed experiments." In 1997, after a year of research and experimentation, Comiskey and fellow MIT undergraduate JD Albert realized a working prototype.

In 1997, Albert, Comiskey and Jacobson along with Russ Wilcox and Jerome Rubin founded E Ink Corporation.

Albert contributed a chapter on design thinking for early-stage startups to the book Design Thinking: New Product Development Essentials from the PDMA. He has also contributed articles about product development to Entrepreneur and Wired.

== Personal life and education ==
Albert has a Bachelor's of Science in Mechanical Engineering from MIT. He lives in Philadelphia.
