= Barrett Comiskey =

American innovator

- Born: September 18, 1975 (age 50); New York
- Education: Massachusetts Institute of Technology (BS); Stanford Graduate School of Business (MBA); National Tsing Hua University (PhD Candidate)
- Occupations: Inventor, Entrepreneur
- Known for: Electronic ink (inventor)
- Awards: National Inventors Hall of Fame (2016); European Inventor Award Finalist (2013); World Economic Forum Tech Pioneer (2002)

Barrett Comiskey (born September 1975) is an American innovator and entrepreneur, best known as the inventor of electronic ink. He is recognized by the World Economic Forum as a Technology Pioneer and was the youngest inductee into the National Inventors Hall of Fame.

Comiskey currently heads Lab Formosa, a design and applied research studio focused on developing new applications for electronic ink and related technologies.

In addition to his early work pioneering electronic paper, Comiskey has founded and developed ventures across Asia in media, energy, and biotechnology.

== Career ==
=== E Ink ===
Comiskey is one of the "fathers of E Ink." As an undergraduate at the Massachusetts Institute of Technology, Comiskey invented the microencapsulated electrophoretic display, commercialized by E Ink, which he co-founded in 1997 and is now worth approximately $8 billion.

In 1995, at the age of 19, he began developing electronic ink during nights and weekends at the MIT Media Lab after MIT professor Joseph Jacobson challenged him to create a technology that would mimic the appearance of ink on paper. Comiskey ultimately conceived the microencapsulated electrophoretic display, which overcame the many practical challenges faced by previous attempts at realizing workable particle-based displays.

Relying on self-taught work in materials science, optics, colloidal physics, and microencapsulation, he and fellow MIT undergraduate JD Albert realized a working prototype of a technology “that leaders of the material science department at MIT and the chemistry department said was impossible.” Comiskey later described the moment: “Early one morning in January 1997, we took a microcapsule, put it on a slide in between two pieces of copper, put it under a microscope, and for the first time were able to see a particle moving back and forth.”

Over the next decade, Comiskey worked on the further development and industrialization of the technology at MIT and subsequently at E Ink, both in Cambridge, Massachusetts, and Shanghai, China.

For its role in the evolution of the publishing industry, E Ink has been called "the greatest innovation since Gutenberg."

While still an undergraduate at MIT, Comiskey was published as first author of the May 1998 cover article of Nature magazine, "An electrophoretic ink for all-printed reflective electronic displays".

Comiskey holds 72 patents. He was recognized as a "Technology Pioneer" by the World Economic Forum, and was inducted into the National Inventors Hall of Fame in May 2016 for the invention and commercialization of E Ink, together with Joe Jacobson and JD Albert. Interviewed at the time of the induction, Comiskey laid out the technology's founding ambition: "Our original vision was, and remains, that E Ink…can be adhered beautifully and invisibly to all kinds of surfaces, imbuing them with the ability to express either aesthetic or artistic designs, or more importantly, convey relevant information when needed, and then disappear invisibly into the background as appropriate."

=== Nicobar Group ===
After completing his M.B.A. at Stanford University's Graduate School of Business, Comiskey founded Nicobar Group, a business advisory firm.

Beginning as a startup "helping Western manufacturers and private equity firms do work in Asia," in its early days the firm established production lines at Foxconn for Motorola's Motofone F3 in Longhua, shipping 10 million units to India. Later, the firm grew to specialize in developing supply chain infrastructure for Western firms participating in China’s nuclear power program.

In 2008, Comiskey was the subject of an extended Esquire feature, "The New American," which chronicled Nicobar's work in China, where "everything is possible, but nothing is easy." Of his early days in Shanghai, Comiskey recalled: "It felt like the frontier, like the Wild West. It felt electric."

=== Migo ===
In 2009, Comiskey founded Migo, a technology company that provided affordable data services for emerging markets. Its content delivery network distributed digital products and services to mass market consumers at the local corner store through Migo Download Stations (MDS). Offering a solution far cheaper than alternatives, Migo aimed to level the digital playing field for consumers with limited data usage.

Backed by sovereign wealth fund Temasek, YouTube's co-founder and former CTO Steve Chen, and other noteworthy investors, Migo's unique technology was shortlisted for the IBC 2021 Innovation Awards, for creating "an entirely new way to deliver digital content in countries that lack a widespread broadband infrastructure."

After partnering with Hary Tanoesoedibjo’s Indonesian media conglomerate MNC Group, Comiskey exited the company in 2022. At the time Migo wound down operations in 2023, it had 1,700 MDS serving 30 million Indonesians.

=== Hirotsu Bio Science ===
In December 2023, Comiskey was appointed Director and Chief Strategy Officer of Hirotsu Bio Science, a Tokyo-based early cancer detection company best known for its N-NOSE urine test using Caenorhabditis elegans nematodes. His work focused on developing the company's international growth strategy and expanding N-NOSE beyond Japan.

=== Lab Formosa ===
In early 2026, Comiskey founded Lab Formosa, a design and applied research studio based in Taipei, Taiwan. In developing new applications for electronic ink across objects, spaces, and infrastructure, the lab extends the technology he invented beyond its established deployments in e-readers, electronic shelf labels, and signage. Comiskey has described the project as a return to his original vision for the material: calm, adaptable surfaces that change infrequently, but meaningfully.

== Research and contributions ==
Comiskey's publications have been widely cited and credited with establishing new fields of research. His 1998 Nature paper on electrophoretic displays ("An electrophoretic ink for all-printed reflective electronic displays") is described in reviews as the breakthrough that enabled electronic paper and the E Ink industry. Later surveys credited the work with catalyzing both the technological and commercial development of flexible electronic paper, and a 2024 review in the Journal of Optical Microsystems identified it as the technical foundation for all-printed reflective displays.

Retrospectives from the European Patent Office, MIT Media Lab, and IEEE Spectrum have further highlighted Comiskey's role in inventing electronic ink and establishing electrophoretic displays as the industry standard. Bibliometric studies note that the paper has been cited over 1,700 times, making it one of the most cited works in display technology.

His earlier work on information hiding, co-authored with J. R. Smith, has likewise been cited in landmark surveys as a foundational contribution to digital steganography and watermarking, introducing the mathematical trade-offs between robustness, capacity, and perceptibility in spread-spectrum data hiding.

In 2025, Comiskey began Ph.D. research in Life Sciences at National Tsing Hua University in Hsinchu, Taiwan. His initial research focused on C. elegans as a model organism, with particular emphasis on improving reproducibility across laboratories worldwide. Other areas of interest included chemotaxis assays, alternatives to agar substrates, dietary and circadian influences, pheromone signaling, and development of a low-cost "WormBox" device for environmental control. As of 2026, Comiskey's research is on pause.

== Personal life and education ==
Comiskey holds an M.B.A. from Stanford University, a B.S. in Mathematics from MIT, and is an alumnus of Regis High School in New York City.

Comiskey grew up in the creative ferment of New York City during the 1980s, an experience he has credited with shaping his thinking about public surfaces and media. He has been based in Asia since 2004, living in Shanghai, Taipei, and Manila.
