= Kovio =

Company based in San Jose, California

- Company type: Privately held
- Industry: Tech hardware & semiconductors
- Founded: 2007; 19 years ago in San Jose, California
- Founders: Joseph Jacobson; Colin Bulthaup; Brian Hubert; Brent Ridley
- Website: www.kovio.com

Kovio, Inc. was a privately held Silicon Valley technology company headquartered in San Jose, California that manufactured electronic devices based on a proprietary printed silicon electronics platform. Products included Near Field Communication (NFC) tags for use in mobile marketing, authentication, and advertising as well as electronic article surveillance (EAS) labels for anti-shoplifting applications. On January 21, 2014 Thin Film Electronics ASA acquired Kovio technology, intellectual property and production equipment.

== History ==
Kovio was founded in 2001 under the name Nanotectonica by affiliates of the MIT Media Lab, including Joe Jacobson, Colin Bulthaup, Brian Hubert, and Brent Ridley.

Kovio appeared at the 2007 IDTechEx Printed Electronics USA Conference, at which the company introduced the world’s first all-printed, high-performance silicon thin-film transistor with an electron mobility of 80cm2/Vs. Kovio was subsequently awarded the 2007 Technical Development Materials Award and 2008 New Product Development Award by industry analyst IDTechEx. On January 21, 2014 Thin Film Electronics ASA acquired Kovio technology and production equipment.

== Memberships and partnerships ==
In February 2010, Kovio and Nissan Chemical Industries announced a collaboration and development partnership to scale Kovio’s silicon ink to commercial volumes, and to introduce and commercialize such inks in display applications.

In November 2012, Kovio and Nedap Retail announced a new Electronic Article Surveillance (EAS) label that can be integrated directly into clothing, shoes, and other products to discourage shoplifting. The product is sold by Nedap Retail under the ‘!FaST’ brand name.

In March 2013, Kovio announced a strategic partnership with Symphony Teleca to co-develop software services to bring big data analytics to NFC-based mobile marketing campaigns.

Kovio is a principal member of the NFC Forum.

== Investors ==
Kovio raised over US$100 million in its venture financing. Prominent investors include Kleiner Perkins Caufield & Byers, DAG Ventures, Tyco Retail Solutions, Harris & Harris Group, Flagship Venture Partners, Pangaea Ventures, and others.
